This list of the Paleozoic life of Texas contains the various prehistoric life-forms whose fossilized remains have been reported from within the US state of Texas and are between 538.8 and 252.17 million years of age.

A

 †Aboculus – type locality for genus
 †Aboculus robustus – type locality for species
 †Acanthocladia
 †Acanthocladia americana
 †Acanthocladia guadalupensis
 †Acanthoclema
 †Acanthocoryna
 †Acanthocoryna stauroma
 †Acanthocrania
 †Acanthocrania alta – type locality for species
 †Acanthocrania conferta – type locality for species
 †Acanthocrania densispina – type locality for species
 †Acanthocrania intermedia
 †Acanthocrania magna
 †Acanthocrania minutispinosa – type locality for species
 †Acanthocrania platys – type locality for species
 †Acanthocrania regularis
 †Acanthocrania vasta – type locality for species
 †Acanthopecten
 †Acanthopecten carboniferus – or unidentified related form
 †Acanthopecten coloradoensis
 †Acanthopecten delawarensis – type locality for species
 †Acanthoplecta
 †Acanthoplecta inopinata – type locality for species
 †Acanthorota – type locality for genus
 †Acanthorota permiana – type locality for species
 †Acanthoschizorota – type locality for genus
 †Acanthoschizorota variabilis – type locality for species
   †Acheloma – type locality for genus
 †Acheloma cumminsi – type locality for species
 †Achistrum
 †Achistrum brownwoodensis – type locality for species
 †Achistrum ludwigi – type locality for species
 †Achistrum monochordata
 †Acolosia – type locality for genus
 †Acolosia anomala – type locality for species
 †Acolosia elliptica
 †Acolosia exasperata
 †Acolosia glabra
 †Acolosia magna
 †Acolosia recepta – type locality for species
 †Acosarina
 †Acosarina baylorensis – type locality for species
 †Acosarina mesoplatys – type locality for species
 †Acosarina minuta – type locality for species
 †Acosarina peculiaris – type locality for species
 †Acosarina rectimarginata
 †Acritosia
 †Acritosia magna
 †Acritosia magnifica
 †Acritosia peculiaris – type locality for species
 †Acritosia silicica
 †Acritosia solida
 †Acritosia teguliferoides – type locality for species
 †Acritosia vestibula
  †Acrodus – tentative report
 †Acrodus olsoni – type locality for species
 †Acrodus sweetlacruzensis – type locality for species
 †Acrothele
 †Actinocoelia
 †Actinocoelia maeandrina
 †Actinocoelia verrucosa – type locality for species
 †Actinoconchus
 †Actinohymen – type locality for genus
 †Actinohymen russelli – type locality for species
 †Actinophrentis
 †Actinophrentis bonespringense – type locality for species
 †Actinophrentis columnare – type locality for species
 †Acutichiton
 †Acutichiton pannuceus – type locality for species
 †Acutichiton pyrmidalus
 †Adamantina
 †Adamantina foliacea
 †Adlatipora – type locality for genus
 †Adlatipora fossulata – type locality for species
 †Adrianites – tentative report
 †Agathiceras
 †Agathiceras applini – type locality for species
 †Agathiceras ciscoense – type locality for species
 †Agathiceras contractum – type locality for species
 †Agathiceras frechi – type locality for species
 †Agathiceras girtyi – type locality for species
 †Agathiceras uralicum
 †Agelesia
 †Agelesia triagonalis – type locality for species
 †Agmoblastus
 †Agmoblastus caddense – type locality for species
 †Agnostocrinus
 †Agnostocrinus ornatus – type locality for species
 †Akmilleria
 †Akmilleria adkinsi – type locality for species
 †Akmilleria electraensis
 †Akmilleria huecoensis – type locality for species
 †Albaillella
 †Albaillella foremanae – type locality for species
 †Alegeinosaurus
   †Alethopteris
 †Alilepis
 †Alisporites
 †Alisporites plicatus – type locality for species
 †Alisporites zapfei
 †Allagecrinus
 †Allagecrinus bassleri
 †Allopiloceras
 †Allorhynchus
 †Allorhynchus circulare
 †Allorhynchus concentricum
 †Allorhynchus formulosum
 †Allorhynchus permianum – type locality for species
 †Allorhynchus triangulatum – type locality for species
 †Allorhynchus variabile – type locality for species
 †Allorhynchus venustulum
 †Allorisma – tentative report
 †Allorisma albequus
 †Allorisma dubium – or unidentified related form
 †Allotropiochisma
 †Allotropiochisma flabellum – type locality for species
 †Allotropiochisma texanum – type locality for species
 †Allotropiochisma uddenitense – type locality for species
 †Almites
 †Almites sellardsi – type locality for species
 †Altadema – type locality for genus
 †Altadema convexa – type locality for species
 †Altiplecus
 †Altiplecus argutus
 †Altiplecus cooperi
 †Altiplecus deltosus
 †Altiplecus extensus
 †Altiplecus glebosus – type locality for species
 †Altiplecus periosus
 †Altiplecus trapezoidalis
 †Altudoceras
 †Altudoceras altudense – type locality for species
 †Altudoceras cooperi – type locality for species
 †Altudoceras serratum – type locality for species
 †Alveus – type locality for genus
 †Alveus depressus – type locality for species
 †Amandophyllum
 †Amaurotoma
 †Amaurotoma subsinuata
 †Amblysiphonella
 †Ambozone
 †Ambozone dictyonema
 †Ametoria – type locality for genus
 †Ametoria residua – type locality for species
 †Ammovertella
 †Amphicrinus
 †Amphipella
 †Amphipella arcaria
 †Amphipella attenuata
 †Amphiscapha
 †Amphiscapha catilloides
 †Amphiscapha dextrata – type locality for species
 †Amphiscapha gigantea – type locality for species
 †Amphiscapha muricata
 †Amphiscapha subquadrata
 †Amphissites
 †Amphissites centronotus – or unidentified comparable form
 †Amphissites knighti – type locality for species
 †Amplexizaphrentis
 †Amplexocarinia
 †Amplexus – report made of unidentified related form or using admittedly obsolete nomenclature
  Amusium – tentative report
 †Ananias
 †Ananias appeli
 †Ananias labrectus
 †Ananias ootomaria – type locality for species
 †Ananias permianus
 †Ananias welleri
 †Anatsabites
 †Anatsabites multiliratus – type locality for species
 †Anatsabites williamsi
 †Anconochilus – type locality for genus
 †Anconochilus barnesi – type locality for species
 †Anemonaria
 †Anemonaria sublaevis – type locality for species
 †Aneuthelasma
 †Aneuthelasma amygdalinum
 †Angelosaurus – type locality for genus
 †Angelosaurus dolani – type locality for species
 †Angelosaurus greeni – type locality for species
 †Angyomphalus
 †Anisodexis
 †Anisopyge – type locality for genus
 †Anisopyge cooperi – type locality for species
 †Anisopyge perannulata – type locality for species
   †Annularia
 †Annularia maxima
 †Annularia spicata
 †Annularia stellata – or unidentified comparable form
 †Annuliconcha
 †Annuliconcha dentata
 †Annuliconcha interlineata
 †Anodontacanthus
 †Anodontacanthus americanus
 †Anomalesia
 †Anomalesia perplexa
 †Anomaloria
 †Anomaloria anomala
 †Anomphalus
 †Anomphalus studiosus – type locality for species
 †Anomphalus umbilicatus – or unidentified comparable form
 †Anomphalus verruculiferus
 †Anopliopsis
 †Anopliopsis subcarinata
 †Anoptychia
 †Anteridocus – type locality for genus
 †Anteridocus bicostatus
 †Anteridocus erugatus
 †Anteridocus eximius
 †Anteridocus gongylus – type locality for species
 †Anteridocus paucicostatus – type locality for species
 †Anteridocus seminudus
 †Anteridocus subcarinatus
 †Anteridocus swallovianus – type locality for species
 †Anteridocus triangulatus
 †Anthracopupa
 †Anthracopupa ohioensis
 †Anthracosycon
 †Anthracosycon auriforme – type locality for species
 †Anthracosycon ficus
 †Anthracosycon regulare
 †Antiquatonia
 †Antiquatonia inflativentra
 †Antiquatonia portlockianus
 †Antronaria – type locality for genus
 †Antronaria dissona – type locality for species
 †Antronaria emarginata
 †Antronaria indentata
 †Antronaria mesicostalis – type locality for species
 †Antronaria pluricosta
 †Antronaria specialis
 †Antronaria speciosa – type locality for species
 †Antronaria spectabilis
 †Antronaria titania
 †Antronaria transversa
 †Antronaria voluminosa – type locality for species
 †Apachella
 †Apachella capertoni – type locality for species
 †Apachella exaggerata
 †Apachella franciscana
 †Apachella glabra – type locality for species
 †Apachella huecoensis – type locality for species
 †Apachella nodosa
 †Apachella powwowensis – type locality for species
 †Apachella prodontia
 †Apachella pseudostrigillata
 †Apachella texana – type locality for species
 †Apachella translirata
 †Apachella turbiniformis
 †Apatokephalus
 †Apatokephalus serratus
 †Aphaurosia
 †Aphaurosia rotundata
 †Aphaurosia scutata
 †Aphelaspis
  †Aphetoceras
 †Aphlebia
 †Apographiocrinus
 †Apographiocrinus arcuatus – or unidentified comparable form
 †Apographiocrinus raderi – type locality for species
 †Apographiocrinus typicalis
 †Apotocardium
 †Apotocardium cordatum – type locality for species
 †Apotocardium obliquum
  †Apsisaurus – type locality for genus
 †Apsisaurus witteri – type locality for species
 †Apsotreta
 †Apsotreta expansa
 †Apterrinella – tentative report
 †Araeonema
 †Araeonema virgatum
   †Araeoscelis – type locality for genus
 †Araeoscelis casei
 †Araeoscelis gracilis – type locality for species
 †Araucarites
 †Araxathyris – or unidentified comparable form
 †Arceodomus
 †Arceodomus prolata – type locality for species
 †Archaeocidaris
 †Archaeocidaris brownwoodensis – type locality for species
 †Archaeocidaris cratis
 †Archaeocycas
 †Archaeocycas whitei
 Archaeolithophyllum
 †Archaeolithoporella
 †Archaeoscyphia
 †Archaeoscyphia annulata
  †Archeria – type locality for genus
 †Archeria crassidisca – type locality for species
  †Archimedes
 †Arcochiton
 †Arcochiton raymondi
 †Arcuolimbus
 †Arcuolimbus convexus
 †Arionthia – type locality for genus
 †Arionthia alata
 †Arionthia blothrhachis – type locality for species
 †Arionthia germana – type locality for species
 †Arionthia lamaria
 †Arionthia polypleura
 †Aristoceras
 †Aristoceras appressum
 †Armenoceras
 †Armenoceras australe
 †Arrectocrinus
 †Arrectocrinus major – type locality for species
 †Arrectocrinus texanus – type locality for species
 †Artinskia
 †Artinskia artiensis
 †Artinskia lilianae – type locality for species
 †Artisia
 †Asaphellus
 †Aspidiopsis
 †Aspidosaurus – type locality for genus
 †Aspidosaurus binasser – type locality for species
 †Aspidosaurus chiton – type locality for species
 †Aspidosaurus glascocki – type locality for species
 †Aspidosaurus peltatus – type locality for species
 †Assimulia
 †Assimulia abscessa – type locality for species
 †Assimulia arta – type locality for species
 †Assimulia compacta – type locality for species
 †Assimulia flexibilis – type locality for species
 †Assimulia fracta – type locality for species
 †Assimulia frequentis – type locality for species
 †Assimulia recrea – type locality for species
 †Assimulia tergida – type locality for species
 †Assimulia uddenitense – type locality for species
 †Astartella
 †Astartella concentrica
 †Astartella nasuta
 †Astartella subquadrata
 †Astegosia
 †Astegosia subquadrata
 †Atelestegastus
 †Atelestegastus marginatus
 †Athlocrinus
 †Athyris
 †Athyris bradyensis – type locality for species
 †Attenuatella
 †Attenuatella texana
  †Aulopora – report made of unidentified related form or using admittedly obsolete nomenclature
 †Aulosteges
 †Aurikirkbya
 †Aurikirkbya auriformis – type locality for species
 †Aurikirkbya barbarae – type locality for species
 †Aurikirkbya wordensis – type locality for species
 †Austinella
 †Austinella kankakensis
 †Australosutura
 †Australosutura llanoensis
  †Aviculopecten
 †Aviculopecten ballingerana
 †Aviculopecten girtyi – type locality for species
 †Aviculopecten gryphus – type locality for species
 †Aviculopecten herzeri
 †Aviculopecten occidentalis
 †Aviculopecten sumnerensis
 †Aviculopecten texanus
 †Aviculopinna
 †Avonia
 †Avonia honeycreekensis – type locality for species
 †Avonia latidorsata
 †Avonia meekana
 †Avonia pustulifera – or unidentified comparable form
 †Avonia signata
 †Avonia subhorrida
 †Avonia walcottiana
0 Links

B

 †Babylonites – type locality for genus
 †Babylonites acutus – type locality for species
 †Babylonites carinatus – type locality for species
 †Babylonites conicus – type locality for species
 †Babylonites turritus – type locality for species
 †Bactrites
 †Bactrites elcapitanensis
 †Baiosoma
 †Baiosoma pala – type locality for species
 Bairdia
 †Bairdia guadalupiana – type locality for species
 †Bairdia permiana – type locality for species
 †Bairdia plebeia – or unidentified related form
 †Bairdia pruniseminata – type locality for species
 †Bairdia rhomboidalis – type locality for species
 †Bairdia subfusiformis – type locality for species
 †Bairdia wordensis – type locality for species
 †Bakevellia
 †Balkoceras – type locality for genus
 †Balkoceras gracile – type locality for species
 †Bamberina
 †Bamberina annectens
 †Bamyaniceras
 †Bamyaniceras knighti
 †Bamyaniceras simile
 †Barbclabornia
 †Barbclabornia luedersensis – type locality for species
 †Barnesoceras – type locality for genus
 †Barnesoceras clavatum – type locality for species
 †Barnesoceras conosiphonatum – type locality for species
 †Barnesoceras expansum – type locality for species
 †Barnesoceras lamellosum – type locality for species
 †Barnesoceras lentiexpansum – type locality for species
 †Barnesoceras percurvatum – type locality for species
 †Barnesoceras transversum – type locality for species
 †Bathyglyptus – type locality for genus
 †Bathyglyptus theodori – type locality for species
 †Bathymyonia
 †Bathymyonia nevadensis
 †Bathyurellus
 †Baylea
 †Baylea delawarensis – type locality for species
 †Baylea huecoensis – type locality for species
 †Baylea knighti
 †Baylea kuesi – type locality for species
 †Baylea subconstricta
 †Baylea supercrenata – or unidentified comparable form
 †Baylea vjatkensis
 †Beecheria
 †Beecheria chouteauensis
 †Beecheria elliptica
 †Beecheria expansa
  †Bellerophon – tentative report
 †Bellerophon
 †Bellerophon complanatus – type locality for species
 †Bellerophon deflectus
 †Bellerophon graphicus
 †Bellerophon hilli – type locality for species
 †Bellerophon huecoensis – type locality for species
 †Bellerophon kingorum – type locality for species
 †Bellerophon majusculus
 †Bellerophon parvicristus – type locality for species
 †Bellerophor
 †Belodella
 †Belodella silurica
 †Belodella striata – or unidentified comparable form
 †Beltella
 †Bembexia
 †Biarmeaspira
 †Biarmeaspira multilineata
 †Bicuerda
 †Bicuerda columnare – type locality for species
 †Bighornia
 †Bighornia patella – or unidentified comparable form
 †Bitaunioceras
 †Bitaunioceras texanum – type locality for species
 †Blountia
 †Blountia assimilis
 †Blountia ovata
 †Blountiella
 †Blountina
 †Blountina westoni – or unidentified related form
 †Boesites
 †Boesites kingi – type locality for species
 †Boesites scotti – type locality for species
 †Boesites texanus – type locality for species
   †Bolosaurus – type locality for genus
 †Bolosaurus major – type locality for species
 †Bolosaurus striatus – type locality for species
 †Borestus
 †Borestus magdalenensis – type locality for species
 †Borestus texanus – type locality for species
 †Bothrionia – type locality for genus
 †Bothrionia guadalupensis
 †Bothrionia nasuta – type locality for species
 †Bothrionia pulchra
 †Bothrionia transversa – type locality for species
 †Bothrostegium – type locality for genus
 †Bothrostegium compactum – type locality for species
 †Bothrostegium derbyoideum
 †Bothrostegium pusillum
 †Boultonia
 †Boultonia guadalupensis – type locality for species
 †Bowmanites
    †Brachydectes
 †Brachydectes elongatus
 †Brachydegma
 †Brachydegma caelatum
 †Brachymetopus – tentative report
 †Brachymetopus rhinorhachis – type locality for species
 †Brachyphyllum – tentative report
 †Brachyphyllum densum – type locality for species
 †Brachythyris
 †Brachythyris chouteauensis
 †Bradyphyllum
 †Bradyphyllum coagmentum – type locality for species
 †Bradyphyllum counterseptatum – type locality for species
 †Bradyphyllum postwannense – type locality for species
 †Branneroceras
 †Branneroceras branneri
 †Brochidium
 †Brochidium morrisi – type locality for species
  †Broiliellus – type locality for genus
 †Broiliellus arroyoensis – type locality for species
 †Broiliellus brevis – type locality for species
 †Broiliellus olsoni – type locality for species
 †Broiliellus peltatus – type locality for species
 †Broiliellus texensis – type locality for species
 †Bryograptus
 †Bryorhynchus
 †Bryorhynchus bisulcatum – type locality for species
 †Bryorhynchus gratiosum – type locality for species
 †Bryorhynchus nitidum
 †Bryorhynchus plicatum
 †Bucanopsis
 †Bucanopsis type locality for species – informal
 †Buekkella
 †Buekkella digitata – type locality for species
 †Burenoceras
 †Burenoceras cornucopia – type locality for species
 †Burenoceras muricoides – type locality for species
 †Burenoceras phragmoceroides – type locality for species
 Bythocypris
 †Byzantia – type locality for genus
 †Byzantia obliqua – type locality for species

C

    †Cacops
 †Cacops aspidephorus – type locality for species
 †Cactosteges – type locality for genus
 †Cactosteges anomalus – type locality for species
   †Calamites
 †Calamites undulatus
 †Calapoecia
 †Calapoecia ungava – or unidentified comparable form
 †Calathium
 †Calcivertella
 †Calclamnella
 †Calclyra
 †Calclyra eiseliana
 †Calclyra spathulata – type locality for species
 †Calclyra spinata – type locality for species
 †Calclyra triangulata – type locality for species
 †Calliprotonia
  †Callipteridium
 †Callipteridium pteridium – or unidentified comparable form
 †Callipteridium virginianum
 †Callipteris
 †Callipteris conferta
 †Callipteris flabellifera
 †Callispirina
 †Callispirina rotunda
 †Callistadia – type locality for genus
 †Callistadia bella – type locality for species
 †Callitomaria
 †Callitomaria magna – type locality for species
 †Callitomaria stanislavi
 †Calophyllum – tentative report
 †Calycocoelia
 †Calycocoelia typicalis
 †Camarelasma
 †Camarelasma neali
 †Camarophorella
 †Camarophorella dorsata – type locality for species
 †Camarophorina – tentative report
 †Camarotoechia
 †Campophyllum – tentative report
 †Campophyllum texanum – type locality for species
 †Camptochiton – type locality for genus
 †Camptochiton squarrosus – type locality for species
 †Camptonectes – tentative report
 †Cancrinella
 †Cancrinella boonensis – tentative report
 †Cancrinella parva
 †Cancrinella planumbona
 †Cancrinella sparsispinosa
 †Cancrinella subquadrata – type locality for species
 †Caneyella
 †Caneyella wapanuckensis
 †Capillomesolobus
 †Capillomesolobus permianus
 †Captorhinikos
 †Captorhinikos chozaensis – type locality for species
 †Captorhinikos valensis
 †Captorhinoides – type locality for genus
 †Captorhinoides valensis – type locality for species
  †Captorhinus – type locality for genus
 †Captorhinus aguti – type locality for species
 †Captorhinus laticeps – type locality for species
 †Carbonicola
 †Carbonocoryphe
 †Carbonocoryphe depressa
 †Carbonocoryphe planucauda
 †Cardiella
 †Cardiella electraensis
 †Cardiella ganti
 †Cardiella sulcata – type locality for species
  †Cardiocephalus – type locality for genus
 †Cardiocephalus sternbergi – type locality for species
 †Cardiomorpha
 †Carphites – type locality for genus
 †Carphites diabloensis – type locality for species
 †Carphites plectus
 †Carpolithes
 †Carrolla – type locality for genus
 †Carrolla craddocki – type locality for species
 †Cartorhium – type locality for genus
 †Cartorhium chelomatum – type locality for species
 †Cartorhium coristum
 †Cartorhium latum – type locality for species
 †Cartorhium mexicanum – type locality for species
 †Cartorhium orbiculatum
 †Cartorhium retusum
 †Cartorhium vidriense – type locality for species
 †Cartorhium zoyei – type locality for species
 †Casea – type locality for genus
 †Casea broilii – type locality for species
 †Casea halselli – type locality for species
 †Casea nicholsi – type locality for species
 †Caseoides – type locality for genus
 †Caseoides sanangeloensis – type locality for species
 †Caseopsis
 †Caseopsis agilis – type locality for species
 †Cassianoides – type locality for genus
 †Cassianoides kingorum – type locality for species
 †Cassiavellia – type locality for genus
 †Cassiavellia galtarae – type locality for species
  †Catenipora
 †Catenipora workmanae – type locality for species
 †Catenispongia – type locality for genus
 †Catenispongia agaricus – type locality for species
 †Cathaysiopteris
 †Cathaysiopteris yochelsonii – type locality for species
 †Catoraphiceras
 †Cavellina
 †Cavellina ellipticalis – type locality for species
 †Cavellina nebrascensis
  †Cedaria
 †Cedaria gaspensis – or unidentified comparable form
 †Cenorhynchia – type locality for genus
 †Cenorhynchia atmeta
 †Cenorhynchia camerata
 †Cenorhynchia fracida – type locality for species
 †Cenorhynchia hebata
 †Cenorhynchia mitigata
 †Cenorhynchia nasuta
 †Cenorhynchia parvula – type locality for species
 †Cenorhynchia pentagonalis
 †Cenorhynchia saginata – type locality for species
 †Cenorhynchia transversa
 †Cenorhynchia triangulata – type locality for species
 †Cenorhynchia ventricosa
 †Centrotarphyceras
 †Centrotarphyceras longicameratum
 †Ceratobairdia – type locality for genus
 †Ceratobairdia dorsospinosa – type locality for species
 †Ceratopea
 †Ceratopea capuliformis
 †Ceratopea hami – or unidentified comparable form
 †Ceratopea incurvata
 †Ceratopea lemonei – type locality for species
 †Ceratopea unguis – or unidentified comparable form
 †Ceraunocochlis
 †Ceraunocochlis deformis – type locality for species
 †Ceraunocochlis elongata – type locality for species
 †Ceraunocochlis kidderi
 †Ceraunocochlis trekensis – type locality for species
 †Chaeniorhynchus – type locality for genus
 †Chaeniorhynchus inauris
 †Chaeniorhynchus salutare
 †Chaeniorhynchus transversum – type locality for species
 †Chaenomya – tentative report
 †Chaetetes
 †Chaetetes mackrothii – tentative report
  †Chancelloria – tentative report
 †Chauliochiton – type locality for genus
 †Chauliochiton knighti – type locality for species
 †Chaunactis
 †Cheiropyge
 †Cheiropyge koizumii – or unidentified comparable form
 †Chelononia
 †Chelononia neali
 †Chelononia straminea – type locality for species
 †Chiastocolumnia – type locality for genus
 †Chiastocolumnia cylindrica – type locality for species
 †Choanodus – type locality for genus
 †Choanodus anomalus
 †Choanodus irregularis – type locality for species
 †Choanodus perfectus – type locality for species
 †Choctawites
 †Choctawites choctawensis
 †Choctawites cumminsi
 †Chondronia – type locality for genus
 †Chondronia bella – type locality for species
 †Chondronia ningula – type locality for species
 †Chondronia obesa
 †Chondronia ovalis – type locality for species
 †Chondronia parva
 †Chondronia rectimarginata
 †Chonetella
 †Chonetella flemingi
 †Chonetes
 †Chonetes flemingi – tentative report
 †Chonetes permianus
 †Chonetes verneuilianus
 †Chonetinella
 †Chonetinella biplicata
 †Chonetinella ciboloensis
 †Chonetinella crassiparva
 †Chonetinella gerontica
 †Chonetinella parva
 †Chonetinella spinolirata – type locality for species
 †Chonetinetes
 †Chonetinetes angustisulcatus
 †Chonetinetes reversus – type locality for species
 †Chonetinetes varians
 †Chonosteges
 †Chonosteges costellatus – type locality for species
 †Chonosteges limbatus
 †Chonosteges magnicostatus – type locality for species
 †Chonosteges matutinus
 †Chonosteges multicostatus
 †Chonosteges pulcher
 †Chonosteges variabilis – type locality for species
 †Cibecuia
 †Cibecuia gouldii – type locality for species
 †Cibolites – type locality for genus
 †Cibolites uddeni – type locality for species
 †Cibolocrinus – type locality for genus
 †Cibolocrinus erectus – type locality for species
 †Cibolocrinus typus – type locality for species
 †Cinclidonema – type locality for genus
 †Cinclidonema texanum – type locality for species
 †Cladopora – report made of unidentified related form or using admittedly obsolete nomenclature
 †Cladopora spinulata
 †Cladopora tubulata
 †Clarkoceras
 †Clarkoceras luthei – or unidentified related form
 †Clavallus
 †Clavallus spicaudina
 †Cleidophorus – report made of unidentified related form or using admittedly obsolete nomenclature
 †Cleidophorus delawarensis
  †Cleiothyridina
 †Cleiothyridina mulsa
 †Cleiothyridina nana
 †Cleiothyridina pilularis
 †Cleiothyridina prouti – or unidentified comparable form
 †Cleiothyridina rara
 †Cleiothyridina rectimarginata – type locality for species
 †Cleiothyridina tenuilineata
 †Clelandoceras – tentative report
 †Clelandoceras rarum – type locality for species
 †Climacograptus
 †Climacograptus nevadensis
 †Climacograptus tubuliferus
 †Clinodomia
 †Clinodomia obstipa
 †Clinolobus
 †Clinolobus type locality for species – informal
 †Clinopistha – tentative report
 †Clinopistha levis – or unidentified comparable form
 †Clistoceras
 †Clitendoceras
 †Clonograptus
 †Cluthoceras
 †Coccoseris
 †Coccoseris astomata – type locality for species
 †Codonofusiella
 †Codonofusiella paradoxica
 †Coelocladia
 †Coelocladia spinosa
 †Coelocladiella – type locality for genus
 †Coelocladiella lissa
 †Coelocladiella philoconcha – type locality for species
 †Coelogasteroceras
 †Coelogasteroceras mexicanum
 †Coenocystis – type locality for genus
 †Coenocystis richardsoni – type locality for species
 †Coledium
 †Coledium altisulcatum – type locality for species
 †Coledium costatulum – type locality for species
 †Coledium evexum
 †Coledium undulatum
 †Coledium vadosulcatum – type locality for species
 †Collatipora – type locality for genus
 †Collatipora delicata
 †Collatipora discreta – type locality for species
 †Collatipora pyriformis
 †Collemataria – type locality for genus
 †Collemataria americana
 †Collemataria batilliformis
 †Collemataria elongata – type locality for species
 †Collemataria gregaria – type locality for species
 †Collemataria irregularis – type locality for species
 †Collemataria marshalli
 †Collemataria platys – type locality for species
 †Collemataria spatulata
 †Collumatus
 †Collumatus solitarius
 †Colospongia
 †Colospongia americana
 †Colospongia benjamini
 †Colospongiella – type locality for genus
 †Colospongiella permiana – type locality for species
 †Colpites
 †Colpites minutus
 †Colpites monilifera
 †Colpites striata
 †Comia
 †Complexisporites – type locality for genus
 †Complexisporites polymorphus – type locality for species
  †Composita
 †Composita affinis
 †Composita apheles – type locality for species
 †Composita apsidata
 †Composita bucculenta – type locality for species
 †Composita costata
 †Composita cracens
 †Composita crassa – type locality for species
 †Composita discina
 †Composita emarginata
 †Composita enormis – type locality for species
 †Composita imbricata – type locality for species
 †Composita mexicana
 †Composita mira
 †Composita nucella
 †Composita ovata
 †Composita parasulcata – type locality for species
 †Composita persinuata
 †Composita pilula
 †Composita prospera
 †Composita pyriformis
 †Composita quantilla
 †Composita stalagmium
 †Composita strongyle – type locality for species
 †Composita subcircularis
 †Composita subtilita
 †Compressoproductus
 †Compressoproductus acuminatus
 †Compressoproductus concentricus
 †Compressoproductus curtus – type locality for species
 †Compressoproductus flabellatus
 †Compressoproductus parvus
 †Compressoproductus pinniformis
 †Compressoproductus rarus – type locality for species
 †Compressoproductus thomasi – type locality for species
 †Condrathyris
 †Condrathyris perplexa
 †Conjunctio
 †Conocardium – tentative report
 †Conocerina
 †Conocerina brevis – or unidentified comparable form
 †Conocerina unguloides – type locality for species
 †Cooleyella
 †Cooleyella amazonensis
 †Cooleyella duffini – type locality for species
 †Cooperaria – type locality for genus
 †Cooperaria getawayensis – type locality for species
 †Coopericus
 †Coopericus angustus – type locality for species
 †Coopericus semisulcatus
 †Coopericus undatus
 †Cooperina
 †Cooperina inexpectata
 †Cooperina parva – type locality for species
 †Cooperina subcuneata
 †Cooperina triangulata
 †Cooperoceras – type locality for genus
 †Cooperoceras texanum – type locality for species
 †Coosella
 †Coosella beltensis
 †Coosella granulosa
 †Coosella widnerensis – or unidentified comparable form
 †Coosia
 †Coosia pernamagna
  †Cordaites
 †Cordaites principalis
 †Coronakirkbya – type locality for genus
 †Coronakirkbya fimbriata – type locality for species
 †Coryellina
 †Coryellina indicata – type locality for species
 †Coryssochiton – type locality for genus
 †Coryssochiton parallelus – type locality for species
 †Coscinophora – type locality for genus
 †Coscinophora hortoni
 †Coscinophora magnifica – type locality for species
 †Coscinophora monilifera – type locality for species
 †Coscinophora nodosa – type locality for species
 †Costatumulus
 †Costatumulus distortus
 †Costatumulus expansa – type locality for species
 †Costatumulus fragosa
 †Costatumulus villiersi
 †Costellarina – type locality for genus
 †Costellarina costellata – type locality for species
 †Costiferina
 †Costiferina indica
 †Costispinifera
 †Costispinifera costata – type locality for species
 †Costispinifera rugatula
 †Costispinifera walcottiana
 †Cotteroceras
  †Cotylorhynchus
 †Cotylorhynchus hancocki – type locality for species
 †Cranaena
 †Cranaena dorsisulcata – type locality for species
 †Cranaena hannibalensis – or unidentified comparable form
 †Cranaena texana – type locality for species
 Crania
 †Crania permiana – type locality for species
 †Craspedona
 †Craspedona limbata – type locality for species
 †Craspedona newelli
 †Crassumbo – type locality for genus
 †Crassumbo inornatus – type locality for species
 †Crassumbo turgidus – type locality for species
 †Cravenoceras – tentative report
 †Crenispirifer
 †Crenispirifer angulatus – type locality for species
 †Crenispirifer effrenus
 †Crenispirifer jubatus
 †Crenispirifer myllus
 †Crenispirifer sagus
 †Crenulites – type locality for genus
 †Crenulites duncanae – type locality for species
 †Crenulites magnus – type locality for species
 †Cricotus
 †Cricotus crassidiscus – type locality for species
 †Crimites
 †Crimites glomulus – tentative report
 †Crimites type locality for species – informal
 †Cromyocrinus
 †Cromyocrinus grandis – or unidentified comparable form
 †Crossotelos
 †Crossotelos annulatus
 †Cruricella
 †Cruricella minutalis – type locality for species
 †Crurithyris
 †Crurithyris inflata
 †Crurithyris longirostris
 †Crurithyris major
 †Crurithyris parva
 †Crurithyris planoconvexa
 †Crurithyris sulcata
 †Cryptacanthia
 †Cryptacanthia glabra
  †Ctenacanthus
 †Ctenacanthus amblyxiphias – type locality for species
 †Ctenalosia – type locality for genus
 †Ctenalosia fixata – type locality for species
 †Ctenalosia primitiva
 †Ctenalosia rotunda
 †Ctenoptychius
 †Ctenospondylus – type locality for genus
 †Ctenospondylus casei – type locality for species
 †Cullisonia
 †Cullisonia producta
 †Culmitzschia
 †Culunama
 †Culunama bellistiata
 †Cuniculocystis – type locality for genus
 †Cuniculocystis floweri – type locality for species
 †Cupularostrum – tentative report
 †Cyathophylloides
 †Cyathophylloides burksae – type locality for species
 †Cycadospadix
 †Cyclacantharia
 †Cyclacantharia gigantea
 †Cyclacantharia kingorum – type locality for species
 †Cyclacantharia paucispinosa – type locality for species
 †Cyclacantharia robusta
 †Cyclacantharia transitoria – type locality for species
 †Cyclites
 †Cyclites costatus – type locality for species
 †Cyclites multilineata – type locality for species
 †Cyclobathmus
 †Cyclobathmus haworthi
 †Cylicioscapha
 †Cylicioscapha texana – type locality for species
 †Cylicioscapha williamsi – type locality for species
 †Cylindritopsis
 †Cylindritopsis hamiltonae – type locality for species
 †Cylindritopsis insolitus
 †Cylindritopsis spheroides – type locality for species
 †Cylindritopsis vaningeni
 †Cymatospira
 †Cymatospira montfortianus
 †Cyphotalosia – type locality for genus
 †Cyphotalosia masonensis – type locality for species
 †Cypricardinia – tentative report
 †Cypricardinia contracta – type locality for species
 †Cyptendoceras
 †Cyptendoceras richardsoni – type locality for species
 †Cyrtina
 †Cyrtina burlingtonensis
 †Cyrtorostra
 †Cyrtorostra varicostata
 †Cystothalamia – type locality for genus
 †Cystothalamia guadalupensis – type locality for species
 †Cystothalamia megacysta
 †Cystothalamia nodulifera

D

 †Dactylites
 †Dactylites magna – type locality for species
 †Dactylites micropora – type locality for species
 †Dactylites obconica – type locality for species
 †Dactylites subdigitatus – type locality for species
  †Dadoxylon
 †Daharella
 †Daharella crassa – type locality for species
 †Daharella pattersonia – type locality for species
 †Daharella ramosa
 †Daixites
 †Daixites meglitskyi – or unidentified comparable form
 †Dakeoceras – tentative report
 †Dakeoceras mutabile – type locality for species
 †Danaeites
 †Dapsilodus
 †Dapsilodus obliquicostatus
 †Dapsilodus praecipuus
 †Dapsilodus sparsus
 †Daraelites
 †Daraelites leonardensis – type locality for species
  †Dasyceps
 †Dasyceps microphthalmus – type locality for species
 †Dasysaria
 †Dasysaria inca
 †Dasysaria undulata
 †Dasysaria wolfcampensis – type locality for species
 †Dateroceras
 †Daubreeia
 †Decoriconus
 †Decoriconus fragilis
 †Defordia
 †Defordia defuncta
 †Defordia densa – type locality for species
 †Defordia lobata
 †Deiracephalus
 †Deiracephalus aster
 †Delaria
 †Delaria antiqua
 †Delaria brevis – type locality for species
 †Delaria chinatiensis – type locality for species
 †Delaria granti – type locality for species
 †Delaria westexensis – type locality for species
 †Delnortea
 †Delnortea abbotiae
 †Delnortea abbottiae
 †Delocrinus
 †Delocrinus hemisphericus
 †Delocrinus pictus
 †Delocrinus subhemisphericus
 †Deltarina
 †Deltarina magnicostata
 †Deltopecten
 †Demarezites
 †Dendropupa
 †Dendropupa vetusta
 †Densonella
 Dentalium
 †Derbyia
 †Derbyia bella
 †Derbyia bennetti – or unidentified comparable form
 †Derbyia buchi
 †Derbyia carteri
 †Derbyia cincinnata – type locality for species
 †Derbyia ciscoensis – tentative report
 †Derbyia complicata – type locality for species
 †Derbyia crassa
 †Derbyia crenulata
 †Derbyia cymbula
 †Derbyia elevata
 †Derbyia filosa – type locality for species
 †Derbyia informis – type locality for species
 †Derbyia laqueata – type locality for species
 †Derbyia multistriata – tentative report
 †Derbyia nasuta
 †Derbyia pannucia – type locality for species
 †Derbyia profunda
 †Derbyia scitula
 †Derbyia strophomenoidea
 †Derbyia sulcata
 †Derbyia texta – type locality for species
 †Derbyia wabaunseensis – tentative report
 †Derbyoides
 †Derbyoides dunbari
 †Derbyoides marathonensis
 †Dermospheroidalis – type locality for genus
 †Dermospheroidalis irregularis – type locality for species
 †Desmoinsea
 †Diaboloceras
 †Diaboloceras varicostatum
   †Diadectes – type locality for genus
 †Diadectes sideropelicus – type locality for species
 †Diadectes tenuitectes – type locality for species
 †Diaphelasma
 †Diaphelasma oklahomense
 †Dibunophyllum
 †Dibunophyllum moorei
 †Dibunophyllum uddeni – type locality for species
 †Dicellograptus
 †Dicellograptus ornatus
 †Diceromyonia
 †Diceromyonia crassa – type locality for species
 †Dichostasia
 †Dichostasia complex – type locality for species
 †Dichostasia simplex – type locality for species
 †Dicksonites
 †Dicranophyllum
 †Dictyoclostus
 †Dictyoclostus semireticulatus – tentative report
 †Dictyotomaria
 †Dictyotomaria euglyphea – type locality for species
 †Dictyotomaria scitula
 †Dictyotomaria type locality for species – informal
 †Didymodus
 †Didymodus platypternus
 †Dielasma
 †Dielasma adamanteum – type locality for species
 †Dielasma anterolatum
 †Dielasma bellulum
 †Dielasma bovidens
 †Dielasma compactum – type locality for species
 †Dielasma cordatum – type locality for species
 †Dielasma diabloense
 †Dielasma ellipsoideum – type locality for species
 †Dielasma emarginatum – type locality for species
 †Dielasma expansum – type locality for species
 †Dielasma gracile – type locality for species
 †Dielasma hessense
 †Dielasma labiatum
 †Dielasma ligonorum
 †Dielasma longisulcatum
 †Dielasma microrhynchum
 †Dielasma obesum – type locality for species
 †Dielasma perplexum – type locality for species
 †Dielasma pictile
 †Dielasma planidorsatum – type locality for species
 †Dielasma prolongatum
 †Dielasma pygmaeum
 †Dielasma rigbyi
 †Dielasma shafterense – type locality for species
 †Dielasma spatulatum
 †Dielasma subcirculare
 †Dielasma subcylindricum
 †Dielasma sulcatum – type locality for species
 †Dielasma uniplicatum
 †Dielasma zebratum – type locality for species
 †Dielasmella
 †Dielasmella larga – type locality for species
 †Diffingia – type locality for genus
 †Diffingia coita – type locality for species
 †Diffingia collecticia – type locality for species
 †Diffingia divisa – type locality for species
 †Diffingia largifica
 †Diffingia tortuosa – type locality for species
 †Diffingia valida – type locality for species
 †Dimacrodon – type locality for genus
 †Dimacrodon hottoni – type locality for species
 †Dimetrodon – type locality for genus
 †Dimetrodon angelensis – type locality for species
 †Dimetrodon booneorum – type locality for species
 †Dimetrodon dollovianus – type locality for species
 †Dimetrodon gigashomogenes – type locality for species
 †Dimetrodon grandis – type locality for species
 †Dimetrodon kempae – type locality for species
 †Dimetrodon limbatus – type locality for species
 †Dimetrodon loomisi – type locality for species
 †Dimetrodon macrospondylus – type locality for species
 †Dimetrodon milleri – type locality for species
 †Dimetrodon natalis – type locality for species
 †Dioonitocarpidium
 †Diplanus
 †Diplanus apochordus
 †Diplanus catatonus – type locality for species
 †Diplanus lamellatus – type locality for species
 †Diplanus rarus
 †Diplanus redactus
  †Diplocaulus – type locality for genus
 †Diplocaulus brevirostris – type locality for species
 †Diplocaulus copei – type locality for species
 †Diplocaulus magnicornis – type locality for species
 †Diplocaulus primus
 †Diplocaulus recurvatus – type locality for species
 †Diploconula
 †Diploconula biconvexa – type locality for species
 †Diplothmema
 †Diraphora
 †Discinites
 †Discotomaria
 †Discotomaria basisulcata – type locality for species
 †Discotomaria costata
 †Discotomaria dubia – type locality for species
 †Discotomaria nodosa – type locality for species
 †Discotropis – type locality for genus
 †Discotropis girtyi – type locality for species
 †Discotropis publicus
 †Discotropis sulcifer
    †Dissorophus – type locality for genus
 †Dissorophus multicinctus – type locality for species
 †Ditomopyge
 †Ditomopyge decurtata
 †Ditomopyge scitula
 †Divaricosta
 †Divaricosta squarrosa – type locality for species
 †Divaricosta vagabunda
 †Djemelia – tentative report
 †Docoderma – type locality for genus
 †Docoderma papillosum – type locality for species
 †Docoderma rigida
 †Domatoceras
 †Domatoceras texanum – type locality for species
 †Donaldina
 †Donaldina gracilis – type locality for species
 †Donaldina knighti – type locality for species
 †Donaldina robusta
 †Donaldina stevensana
 †Donaldina type locality for species – informal
 †Donaldospira
 †Donaldospira nodosa – type locality for species
 †Donezella
 †Driveria – type locality for genus
 †Driveria ponderosa – type locality for species
 †Dunbarites
 †Dunbarites boardmani – type locality for species
 †Dunbarites rectilaterale
 †Durhamina
 †Durhamina cordillerensis – type locality for species
 †Dvorakia
 †Dvorakia philipi – tentative report
 †Dyoros
 †Dyoros angulatus – type locality for species
 †Dyoros attenuatus
 †Dyoros auriculatus
 †Dyoros complanatus
 †Dyoros concavus – type locality for species
 †Dyoros consanguineus – type locality for species
 †Dyoros convexus
 †Dyoros endospinus – type locality for species
 †Dyoros extensiformis – type locality for species
 †Dyoros extensus – type locality for species
 †Dyoros giganteus
 †Dyoros hillanus
 †Dyoros intrepidus
 †Dyoros lateralis
 †Dyoros magnus
 †Dyoros parvus – type locality for species
 †Dyoros planiextensus – type locality for species
 †Dyoros planus
 †Dyoros quadrangulatus – type locality for species
 †Dyoros rectangulatus – type locality for species
 †Dyoros robustus
 †Dyoros solidus – type locality for species
 †Dyoros strigosus – type locality for species
 †Dyoros subliratus
 †Dyoros subquadratus
 †Dyoros tenuis – type locality for species
 †Dyoros tetragonus
 †Dyoros transversus – type locality for species
 †Dyoros vagabundus – type locality for species
 †Dyoros vulgaris
 †Dyoros wordensis – type locality for species
 †Dysoristus
 †Dysoristus lochmanae

E

 †Echinaria
 †Echinaria moorei
 †Echinaria semipunctatus – tentative report
 †Echinauris
 †Echinauris bella – type locality for species
 †Echinauris boulei
 †Echinauris circularis
 †Echinauris crassa
 †Echinauris interrupta
 †Echinauris irregularis – type locality for species
 †Echinauris lappacea – type locality for species
 †Echinauris lateralis
 †Echinauris liumbona – type locality for species
 †Echinauris parva – type locality for species
 †Echinauris productelloides
 †Echinauris subquadrata – type locality for species
 †Echinauris venustula
 †Echinosteges
 †Echinosteges guadalupensis – type locality for species
 †Echinosteges tuberculatus – type locality for species
 †Economolopsis
 †Economolopsis anodontoides
 †Ectenoceras
 †Ectenolites
 †Ectenolites primus – type locality for species
 †Ectochoristites
 †Ectochoristites inflatus – type locality for species
 †Ectoposia – type locality for genus
 †Ectoposia grandis
 †Ectoposia wildei – type locality for species
 †Ectosteorachis
 †Ectosteorachis nitidus
 †Ectosterohachis
 †Ectosterohachis nitidus
  †Edaphosaurus – type locality for genus
 †Edaphosaurus boanerges
 †Edaphosaurus cruciger – or unidentified related form
 †Edaphosaurus microdus
 †Edaphosaurus pogonias – type locality for species
 †Edestus
 †Edestus minor
 †Edmondia
 †Edmondia bellula – type locality for species
 †Edmondia glabra
 †Edmondia rotunda – type locality for species
 †Edmondia suborbiculata – tentative report
  †Edops
 †Edops craigi
 †Edriosteges – type locality for genus
 †Edriosteges beedei – type locality for species
 †Edriosteges compactus
 †Edriosteges medlicottianus
 †Edriosteges multispinosus – type locality for species
 †Edriosteges tenuispinosus – type locality for species
 †Eirlysia
 †Eirlysia exquisita – type locality for species
 †Eirlysia nodosa – type locality for species
 †Eirlysia reticulata
 †Elassonia
 †Elassonia micraria
 †Elassonia petila
 †Elassonia scitula
 †Elibatocrinus
 †Eliva
 †Eliva inflata
 †Eliva shumardi
 †Elivina
 †Elivina compacta – type locality for species
 †Elivina detecta
 †Elivina sulcifer
 †Ellesmeroceras
 †Elliottella
 †Elliottella minima
 †Elliottella multicostata
 †Elliottella transversalis
 †Elliottella varicostata – type locality for species
 †Elliptechinus – type locality for genus
 †Elliptechinus kiwiaster – type locality for species
 †Elversella – type locality for genus
 †Elversella rugosa
 †Elyx – tentative report
 †Emilites
 †Emilites brownwoodi – type locality for species
 †Emilites incertum
 †Emilites incertus – type locality for species
 †Empedias
 †Empedias molaris
 †Enallosia
 †Enallosia rotundovata
 †Endelocrinus
 †Endelocrinus grafordensis
 †Endelocrinus tumidus
  †Endoceras
 †Endoceras baylorense
 †Endolobus
 †Endolobus renfroae – type locality for species
 †Endoplegma
 †Endoplegma calathus
 †Endothyra
 †Enteletes
 †Enteletes angulatus – type locality for species
 †Enteletes costellatus
 †Enteletes densus
 †Enteletes dumblei – type locality for species
 †Enteletes exiguus
 †Enteletes globosus – type locality for species
 †Enteletes hemiplicata
 †Enteletes leonardensis
 †Enteletes liumbonus – type locality for species
 †Enteletes plummeri – type locality for species
 †Enteletes rotundobesus – type locality for species
 †Enteletes stehlii – type locality for species
 †Enteletes subcircularis
 †Enteletes subnudus
 †Enteletes wolfcampensis
 †Enteletes wordensis
 †Eoasianites
 †Eoasianites smithwickensis
 †Eoasianites subhanieli
 †Eoastarte
 †Eoastarte subcircularis
 †Eocamptonectes
 †Eocamptonectes asperatus
 †Eocamptonectes papillatus
 †Eocamptonectes sculptilis
 Eocaudina
 †Eocaudina marginata
 †Eocaudina mccormacki
 †Eocaudina septaforaminalis
 †Eocaudina subhexagona
 †Eochonetes
 †Eochonetes magna – type locality for species
 †Eochonetes mucronata – type locality for species
 †Eolyttonia
 †Eolyttonia catilla
 †Eolyttonia chaotica – type locality for species
 †Eolyttonia circularis – type locality for species
 †Eolyttonia cornucopia
 †Eolyttonia diabloensis
 †Eolyttonia fredericksi – type locality for species
 †Eolyttonia gigantea – type locality for species
 †Eolyttonia parviconica
 †Eolyttonia phialiforma
 †Eolyttonia pocillata – type locality for species
 †Eolyttonia progressa – type locality for species
 †Eomartiniopsis
 †Eomartiniopsis girtyi
 †Eopteria
 †Eopteria richardsoni
 †Eoschistoceras – type locality for genus
 †Eoschistoceras strawnense – type locality for species
 †Eosyodon – type locality for genus
 †Eosyodon hudsoni – type locality for species
 †Eothalassoceras – tentative report
 †Eothinites
 †Eothinites hessensis – type locality for species
 †Eothinites planulatus
  †Eothyris – type locality for genus
 †Eothyris parkeyi – type locality for species
 †Eotiaris
 †Eotiaris connorsi – type locality for species
 †Eotiaris guadalupensis – type locality for species
 †Eowellerites
 †Eowellerites moorei – type locality for species
 †Ephippioceras
 †Ephippioceras inexpectans – type locality for species
 †Ephippioceras moinellae
 †Epiactinotrypa
 †Epiactinotrypa sera – type locality for species
 †Epimastopora
 †Epiphyton
 †Epithalassoceras
 †Epithalassoceras type locality for species – informal
 †Eridmatus
 †Eridmatus marathonensis – type locality for species
 †Eridmatus texanus
 †Erisocrinus
 †Erisocrinus propinquus – type locality for species
 †Erisocrinus trinodus – type locality for species
 †Ernestiodendron
  †Eryops – type locality for genus
 †Eryops anatinus – type locality for species
 †Eryops kayi – type locality for species
 †Eryops megacephalus – type locality for species
 †Estheria
 †Etheridgella
 †Etheridgella porosa – type locality for species
 †Etoblattina
 †Etoblattina robusta – type locality for species
 †Etoblattina texana – type locality for species
 †Euchondria
 †Euchondria cooperi – type locality for species
 †Euconia – type locality for genus
 †Euconia conicus
 †Euconia etna
 †Euconia umbilicata
 †Euconospira
 †Euconospira obsoleta – type locality for species
 †Euconospira pulchra – type locality for species
 †Euconospira spiroperforata – type locality for species
 †Euconospira varizona
 †Eugonophyllum
 †Eugonophyllum huecoensis
 †Eugonophyllum johnsonii
 †Eumedlicottia
 †Eumedlicottia burckhardti – type locality for species
 †Eumedlicottia whitneyi – type locality for species
 †Eumorphoceras
 †Eumorphoceras bisulcatum
  †Euomphalus
 †Euomphalus cornudanus – type locality for species
 †Euomphalus glabribasis
 †Euomphalus kaibabensis
 †Euomphalus levicarinatus – type locality for species
 †Euomphalus pernodosus
 †Euonychocrinus
 †Euonychocrinus subservire – type locality for species
 †Euphemites
 †Euphemites aequisulcatus
 †Euphemites batteni – type locality for species
 †Euphemites blaneyanus
 †Euphemites circumcostatus
 †Euphemites crenulatus – type locality for species
 †Euphemites exquisitus – type locality for species
 †Euphemites imperator – type locality for species
 †Euphemites kingi – type locality for species
 †Euphemites luxuriosus – type locality for species
 †Euphemites nodocarinatus
 †Euphemites sparciliratus – type locality for species
 †Euphemites vittatus
 †Euphemitopsis
 †Euphemitopsis multinodosa – type locality for species
 †Euphemitopsis paucinodosus
 †Eupleuroceras
 †Eupleuroceras bellulum
 †Eurylepidoides – type locality for genus
 †Eurylepidoides socialis – type locality for species
 †Euryodus – type locality for genus
 †Euryodus primus – type locality for species
 †Euryphyllum – tentative report
 †Euryphyllum profundum – type locality for species
 †Euryphyllum robustum – type locality for species
 †Evolsonia
 †Exaulipora
 †Exaulipora permica
 †Exovasa – type locality for genus
 †Exovasa cystauletoides – type locality for species

F

 †Falsiamplexus – type locality for genus
 †Falsiamplexus delicata
 †Falsiamplexus elongatus – type locality for species
 †Falsiamplexus flexibilis – type locality for species
 †Falsiamplexus reductus – type locality for species
 †Fascicosta
 †Fascicosta bella
 †Fascicosta elongata
 †Fascicosta longaeva
 †Fayettevillea
 †Fenestella
 †Fenestella amplia
 †Fenestella archimediformis
 †Fenestella capitanensis
 †Fenestella firmior
 †Fenestella girtyi
 †Fenestella guadalupensis – type locality for species
 †Fenestella hilli
 †Fenestella popeana
 †Fenestella schucherti – or unidentified comparable form
 †Fenestella spinulifera
 †Fenestella texana – type locality for species
 †Fenestrellina
 †Ferganispira
 †Ferganispira acteonina – type locality for species
 †Fimbrinia
 †Fimbrinia cristatotuberculata
 †Fimbrinia ovata
 †Fimbrinia plummeri
 †Finkelnburgia
 †Finkelnburgia crassicostellata – or unidentified comparable form
 †Finkelnburgia cullisonia – or unidentified comparable form
 †Fissispongia
 †Fissispongia jacksboroensis
 †Fistulipora
 †Fistulipora guadalupae – type locality for species
 †Fistulipora guadalupensis
 †Flexuospiculata – type locality for genus
 †Flexuospiculata hexactina – type locality for species
 †Foordiceras
 †Foordiceras mammiferum – type locality for species
 †Foordiceras ornatissimum – type locality for species
 †Fransonia
 †Fransonia wyomingensis
 †Fusella
 †Fusella llanoensis – type locality for species
 †Fusiella
  †Fusulina – report made of unidentified related form or using admittedly obsolete nomenclature
 †Fusulina elongata – type locality for species

G

 †Gasconadia
 †Gasconadia putilla
 †Gastrioceras
 †Gastrioceras montgomeryense
 †Gastrioceras occidentale
 †Geinitzina
 †Genevievella
 †Genevievella spinox
 †Geniculifera
 †Geniculifera brevicula – type locality for species
  †Geragnostus
  †Gerobatrachus – type locality for genus
 †Gerobatrachus hottoni – type locality for species
 †Gervillia – report made of unidentified related form or using admittedly obsolete nomenclature
 †Gervillia longa
 †Geyerella
 †Geyerella americana – type locality for species
 †Geyerella hessi – type locality for species
 †Geyerella inexpectata – type locality for species
 †Geyerella kingorum
 †Gigantonoclea
 †Gigantopteris
 †Gigantopteris americana
 †Girtycoelia
 †Girtycoelia typica
 †Girtyella
 †Girtyella cedarensis – or unidentified related form
 †Girtyoceras
 †Girtyoceras hamiltonense
 †Girtyoceras meslerianum
 †Girtyocoelia
 †Girtyocoelia beedei
 †Girtypecten
 †Girtypecten sublaqueatus
 †Girtypora
 †Girtypora constricta – type locality for species
 †Girtypora hillana – type locality for species
 †Girtypora ocellata
 †Girtypora terminalis
 †Girtypora vittata
 †Girtyporina
 †Girtyporina incrustans – type locality for species
 †Girtyspira
 †Girtyspira minuta
 †Girtyspira yodai – type locality for species
 †Girvanella
 †Glabrocingulum
 †Glabrocingulum alveozonum
 †Glabrocingulum coronatum
 †Glabrocingulum diablo
 †Glabrocingulum grayvillense
 †Glabrocingulum lupus
 †Glabrocingulum texanum – type locality for species
 †Glaphyrites
 †Glaphyrites angulatus
 †Glaphyrites anguloumbilicatus
 †Glaphyrites deciensis – type locality for species
 †Glaphyrites hyattianus
 †Glaphyrites kansasensis
 †Glaphyrites millsi
 †Glaphyrites modestus – type locality for species
 †Glaphyrites raymondi
 †Glaphyrites ruzencevi
 †Glaphyrites welleri
 †Glassoceras
 †Glassoceras normani – type locality for species
 †Glaucosaurus – type locality for genus
 †Glaucosaurus megalops – type locality for species
  †Glikmanius
 †Glikmanius occidentalis
 †Globivalvulina
 †Glossothyropsis
 †Glossothyropsis carinata
 †Glossothyropsis cryptacanthoides
 †Glossothyropsis immatura
 †Glossothyropsis juvenis
 †Glossothyropsis polita
 †Glossothyropsis rectangulata – type locality for species
 †Glossothyropsis robusta
 †Glossothyropsis sinuata
 †Glossothyropsis superba – type locality for species
 †Gloverilima
 †Gloverilima pratti
 †Glyptagnostus
 †Glyptorthis
 †Glyptorthis maquoketensis
 †Glyptospira
 †Glyptospira cingulata – type locality for species
 †Glyptospira huecoensis – type locality for species
 †Glyptospira quadriserrata – type locality for species
 †Glyptospira tricostata
 †Glyptospira turrita
 †Glyptosteges
 †Glyptosteges angustus – type locality for species
 †Glyptosteges insculptus
 †Glyptosteges intricatus – type locality for species
 †Glyptosteges sulcatus
 †Glyptotomaria – type locality for genus
 †Glyptotomaria apiarium – type locality for species
 †Glyptotomaria marginata – type locality for species
 †Glyptotomaria pistra – type locality for species
 †Gnamptorhynchos
 †Gnamptorhynchos prayi
  †Gnathorhiza
 †Gnathorhiza dikeloda – type locality for species
 †Gnathorhiza serrata
 †Gomphostrobus
 †Gomphostrobus bifidus
 †Goniarina
 †Goniarina appeli – type locality for species
 †Goniarina diabloensis
 †Goniarina futilis
 †Goniarina magniextensa
 †Goniarina permiana
 †Goniarina pyelodes
 †Goniarina striata
 †Goniasma
 †Goniasma lasallense
  †Goniatites
 †Goniatites eganensis
 †Goniatites multiliratus
 †Goniocephalus – type locality for genus
 †Goniocephalus willistoni – type locality for species
 †Goniocladia
 †Goniocladia americana
 †Gonioloboceras
 †Gonioloboceras bridgeportense – type locality for species
 †Gonioloboceras goniolobus
 †Gonioloboceras gracellenae
 †Gonioloboceras parrishi
 †Gonioloboceras welleri
 †Gorgodon – type locality for genus
 †Gorgodon minutus – type locality for species
 †Gosseletina
 †Gosseletina permiana – type locality for species
 †Grammatodon
 †Grammatodon politus
 †Grandaurispina
 †Grandaurispina bella – type locality for species
 †Grandaurispina belliformis
 †Grandaurispina crassa
 †Grandaurispina elongata
 †Grandaurispina gibbosa – type locality for species
 †Grandaurispina kingorum – type locality for species
 †Grandaurispina meekana
 †Grandaurispina rara
 †Grandaurispina rudis
 †Grandaurispina signata – type locality for species
 †Grandaurispina undulata
 †Grandaurispina vaga – type locality for species
 †Graphiocrinus
 †Graphiocrinus bridgeportensis – type locality for species
  †Grewingkia
 †Grewingkia crassa
 †Grewingkia franklinensis
 †Grewingkia robusta
 †Griffithidella
 †Griffithidella alternata
 †Griffithidella doris
 †Gryphochiton
 †Gryphochiton girtyi – type locality for species
 †Guadalupelosia
 †Guadalupelosia inexpectans
 †Guadalupia
 †Guadalupia auricula – type locality for species
 †Guadalupia cupulosa – type locality for species
 †Guadalupia favosa – type locality for species
 †Guadalupia lepta – type locality for species
 †Guadalupia microcamera – type locality for species
 †Guadalupia minuta – type locality for species
 †Guadalupia ramescens – type locality for species
 †Guadalupia vasa – type locality for species
 †Guadalupia zitteliana
 †Guizhoupecten
 †Guizhoupecten cheni
 †Gypospirifer – type locality for genus
 †Gypospirifer anancites – type locality for species
  †Gypospirifer condor
 †Gypospirifer infraplicus
 †Gypospirifer nelsoni

H

 †Hadropipetta
 †Hadropipetta ancora
 †Hamburgia
 †Hamburgia chappelensis – type locality for species
 †Hamburgia texana
 †Haplistion
 †Haplistion aeluroglossa – type locality for species
 †Haplistion megalochetus – type locality for species
 †Haplistion skinneri – or unidentified comparable form
 †Hayasakapecten
 †Hayasakapecten americanus
 †Healdia
 †Healdia unispinosa – type locality for species
 †Healdia vidriensis – type locality for species
 †Hebertella
 †Hebertella occidentalis
 †Hebetorthoceras
 †Hebetorthoceras brokenarrowense
 †Helicoconchus – type locality for genus
 †Helicoconchus elongatus – type locality for species
   †Helicoprion
 †Helicoprion davisii
 †Heliospongia
 †Heliospongia excavata
 †Heliospongia ramosa
 †Heliospongia vokesi
 †Helminthochiton
 †Helminthochiton simplex
 †Hemileurus
 †Hemileurus runcinatus
 †Hemiliroceras
 †Hemiliroceras reticulatum
 †Hemizyga
  †Hercosestria
 †Hercosestria cribrosa – type locality for species
 †Hercosestria hystricula
 †Hercosestria laevis
 †Hercosia
 †Hercosia delicata
 †Hercosia uddeni – type locality for species
 †Heritschioides
 †Hermosanema
 †Hermosanema carinatum – type locality for species
 †Hesperiella
 †Hesperiella permianus – type locality for species
 †Hesperiella wordensis
 †Heteralosia
 †Heteralosia hystricula – type locality for species
 †Heteralosia magnispina
 †Heteralosia paucispinosa
 †Heteralosia tenuispina
 †Heteralosia vidriensis
 †Heteraria
 †Heteraria blakemorei
 †Heterelasma
 †Heterelasma angulatum
 †Heterelasma concavum – type locality for species
 †Heterelasma contortum
 †Heterelasma geniculatum
 †Heterelasma gibbosum – type locality for species
 †Heterelasma glansfagea – type locality for species
 †Heterelasma lenticularia
 †Heterelasma magnum
 †Heterelasma pentagonum – type locality for species
 †Heterelasma quadratum
 †Heterelasma shumardianum
 †Heterelasma solidum – type locality for species
 †Heterelasma sulciplicatum
 †Heterelasma venustulum
 †Heteropecten
 †Heteropecten vanvleeti
 †Heteroschizodus – type locality for genus
 †Heteroschizodus macomoides – type locality for species
 †Hexirregularia – type locality for genus
 †Hexirregularia nana – type locality for species
 †Hiscobeccus – tentative report
 †Hiscobeccus capax
 †Hoffmannia – report made of unidentified related form or using admittedly obsolete nomenclature
 †Hoffmannia fisheri – type locality for species
 †Holcacephalus
 †Holcacephalus tenerus
 †Holosia – type locality for genus
 †Holosia ovalis – type locality for species
 †Holosia ovoidea
 †Holosia regularis
 †Holotricharina – type locality for genus
 †Holotricharina hirsuta – type locality for species
 †Holotricharina sparsa – type locality for species
 †Homagnostus
 †Hormotoma
 †Hormotoma moderata – type locality for species
 †Hustedia
 †Hustedia ampullacea – type locality for species
 †Hustedia bipartita
 †Hustedia catella – type locality for species
 †Hustedia cepacea
 †Hustedia citeria
 †Hustedia compressa
 †Hustedia connorsi – type locality for species
 †Hustedia consuta – type locality for species
 †Hustedia crepax
 †Hustedia culcitula
 †Hustedia cuneata – type locality for species
 †Hustedia decollatensis
 †Hustedia demissa
 †Hustedia glomerosa
 †Hustedia hapala
 †Hustedia hessensis – type locality for species
 †Hustedia huecoensis – type locality for species
 †Hustedia inconspicua
 †Hustedia lusca – type locality for species
 †Hustedia meekana
 †Hustedia mormoni
 †Hustedia mormonii
 †Hustedia narinosa
 †Hustedia opsia
 †Hustedia papillata – type locality for species
 †Hustedia pugilla – type locality for species
 †Hustedia pusilla
 †Hustedia rupinata
 †Hustedia samiata
 †Hustedia sculptilis – type locality for species
 †Hustedia spicata – type locality for species
 †Hustedia stataria
 †Hustedia texana
 †Hustedia tomea
 †Hustedia trisecta
 †Hustedia trita
  †Hybodus
 †Hybodus copei – type locality for species
 †Hypergonia
 †Hypergonia percostata
 †Hypopsia
 †Hypopsia versuta
 †Hypselentoma
 †Hypselentoma ornata – type locality for species
 †Hypseloconus
 †Hypsiptycha
 †Hypsiptycha argenturbicum
 †Hypsiptycha neenah
 †Hystriculina
 †Hystriculina convexa
 †Hystriculina dugoutensis – type locality for species
 †Hystriculina minima
 †Hystriculina pumila
 †Hystriculina sulcata – type locality for species
 †Hystriculina ventroplana
 †Hystriculina wabashensis
 †Hystricurus

I

 †Ianthinopsis
 †Ianthinopsis medialis
 †Icriodus
 †Icriodus eolatericrescens
 †Icriodus gravesi
 †Ideliopsis – type locality for genus
 †Ideliopsis ovalis – type locality for species
 †Illusioluidia – type locality for genus
 †Illusioluidia teneryi – type locality for species
 †Incisimura – type locality for genus
 †Incisimura bella – type locality for species
 †Incrustospongia – type locality for genus
 †Incrustospongia meandrica – type locality for species
 †Institella
 †Institella leonardensis – type locality for species
 †Insulipora
 †Insulipora elegans
 †Iotina
 †Iotina minuta
 †Isacrodus – type locality for genus
 †Isacrodus marthae – type locality for species
 †Ischnoptygma
 †Ischnoptygma archibaldi – type locality for species
 †Ischnoptygma valentinei – type locality for species
  †Isodectes
 †Isodectes obtusus – type locality for species
 †Isogramma
 †Isogramma concavum
 †Isogramma diabloense
 †Isogramma lobatum
 †Isogramma millepunctata
 †Isogramma vidriense
 †Isotrypa
 †Ivanovia

J

  †Janassa
 †Jeffersonia
 †Jeffersonia granosa
 †Jereina – type locality for genus
 †Jereina cylindrica – type locality for species
 †Jereina ramosa – type locality for species
 †Jinogondolella
 †Jinogondolella aserrata
 †Jinogondolella gladirobusta
 †Jinogondolella nankingensis
 †Jinogondolella postserrata
 †Juresania
 †Juresanites
 †Juresanites colemanensis – type locality for species

K

 †Kahneria – type locality for genus
 †Kahneria seltina – type locality for species
 †Kaibabella
 †Kaibabella basilica
 †Kalodomia
 †Kalodomia rugosa
 †Kargalites
 †Kargalites subquadratum
 †Kargalites subquadratus – type locality for species
 †Kargalites type locality for species – informal
 †Kaskia
 †Kaskia rarus
 †Kellettina
 †Kellettina vidriensis – type locality for species
 †Kindlella – type locality for genus
 †Kindlella centrinoda – type locality for species
 †Kindlella fissiloba – type locality for species
 †Kingopora – tentative report
 †Kingstonia
 †Kingstonia pontotocensis
 †Kinsabia
 †Kinsabia variegata
 †Kirkbya
 †Knightina – tentative report
 †Knightina cuestaforma – type locality for species
 †Knightina macknighti – type locality for species
 †Knightites
 †Knightites maximus – type locality for species
 †Knightites medius – type locality for species
 †Knightoceras
 †Knightoceras kempae – type locality for species
 †Knoxosaurus – type locality for genus
 †Knoxosaurus niteckii – type locality for species
 †Kochiproductus
 †Kochiproductus elongatus
 †Kochiproductus occidentalis – type locality for species
 †Kochiproductus peruvianus
 †Kochiproductus primitivus – type locality for species
 †Kochiproductus quadratus
 †Kochiproductus victorioensis – type locality for species
 †Kockelella
 †Kockelella ortus
 †Komia
 †Komiella – report made of unidentified related form or using admittedly obsolete nomenclature
 †Komiella ostiolata
 †Kormagnostus
 †Kormagnostus seclusus
 †Kozlowskia
 †Kozlowskia alata
 †Kozlowskia anterosulcata
 †Kozlowskia capaci
 †Kozlowskia kingi
 †Kozlowskia nasuta
 †Kozlowskia splendens
 †Kozlowskia subsphaeroidalis
 †Kutorginella
 †Kutorginella dartoni – type locality for species
 †Kutorginella lasallensis
 †Kutorginella robusta
 †Kutorginella sullivanensis
 †Kutorginella uddeni
 †Kutorginella umbonata

L

  †Labidosaurikos
 †Labidosaurikos meachami – type locality for species
  †Labidosaurus
 †Labidosaurus barkeri
 †Labidosaurus hamatus – type locality for species
 †Labridens
 †Labridens shupei
 †Lacunospira
 †Lacunospira alta – type locality for species
 †Lacunospira altsia
 †Lacunospira lirata – type locality for species
 †Lamarodus – type locality for genus
 †Lamarodus triangulus – type locality for species
 †Lambeoceras
 †Lambeoceras rotundum
 †Lamellosia
 †Lamellosia lamellosa
 †Lamellospira
 †Lamellospira cincta – type locality for species
 †Lamellospira conica
 †Lamellospira spinosa – type locality for species
 †Langepis – type locality for genus
 †Langepis campbelli
 †Laudonocrinus
 †Laudonocrinus subsinuatus
 †Lawnia – type locality for genus
 †Lawnia taylorensis – type locality for species
 †Lebachia
 †Lecanospira – type locality for genus
 †Lecanospira lecanospiroides – type locality for species
 †Lecanospira sanctisabae
 †Lecythiocrinus
 †Leella
 †Leella bellula – or unidentified comparable form
 †Leioclema
 †Leioclema dozierense – type locality for species
 †Leioclema shumardi
 †Leiorhynchoidea
 †Leiorhynchoidea amygdaloidea – type locality for species
 †Leiorhynchoidea rotundidorsa
 †Leiorhynchoidea scelesta
 †Leiorhynchoidea sublamellosa
 †Leiorhynchoidea sulcata
 †Leiorhynchus
 †Leiorhynchus bisulcatum
 †Leiorhynchus nobilis
 †Leiostegium
 †Lekiskochiton – type locality for genus
 †Lekiskochiton fornicis – type locality for species
 †Lemonea
 †Lemonea cylindrica
 †Lemonea digitata – type locality for species
 †Lemonea simplex – type locality for species
 †Leonardophyllum
 †Leonardophyllum kingi – type locality for species
 †Lepetopsis
 †Lepetopsis capitanensis – type locality for species
 †Lepetopsis haworthi – type locality for species
 †Lepidocrania – type locality for genus
 †Lepidocrania sparsispinosa – type locality for species
 †Lepidocrania sublamellosa
 †Lepidocrania tardispinosa – type locality for species
 †Lepidocyclus
 †Lepidocyclus laddi
 †Lepidocyclus manniensis
 †Lepidophyllum
 †Lepidospirifer
 †Lepidospirifer angulatus – type locality for species
 †Lepidospirifer costellus – type locality for species
 †Lepidospirifer demissus – type locality for species
 †Lepidospirifer inferus
 †Leptagonia
 †Leptalosia
 †Leptalosia ovalis
 †Leptodesma
 †Leptodesma falcata
 †Leptodesma gouldii
 †Leptodesma guadalupensis
 †Leptodus
 †Leptodus americana
 †Leptodus guadalupensis – type locality for species
 †Leptomphalus
 †Leptomphalus micidus – type locality for species
 †Leptoplastides
 †Leptoptygma
 †Leptoptygma subtilistriatum
 †Leptotygria
 †Lercaritubus
 †Lercaritubus problematicus
 †Lesueurilla
 †Leurosina – type locality for genus
 †Leurosina delicata
 †Leurosina lata – type locality for species
 †Leurosina marginata
 †Leurosina serratoseptata
 †Leurosina sinesulca
 †Leurosina vulgarica
  †Levisoceras
 †Levisoceras contractum – type locality for species
 †Levizygopleura
 †Levizygopleura williamsi
 †Lichenaria
 †Limatulina – report made of unidentified related form or using admittedly obsolete nomenclature
 †Limatulina striaticostata – type locality for species
 †Limbella
 †Limbella costata
 †Limbella costellata
 †Limbella limbata – type locality for species
 †Limbella victorioensis
 †Limbella wolfcampensis – type locality for species
 †Lindostromella
 †Lindostromella patula
 †Lindstroemia – report made of unidentified related form or using admittedly obsolete nomenclature
 †Lindstroemia cylindrica – type locality for species
 †Lindstroemia permiana
 Lingula
 †Linipalus
 †Linipalus magnispinus
 †Linoproductus
 †Linoproductus cora
 †Linoproductus delicatus
 †Linoproductus meniscus
 †Linoproductus nasutus – type locality for species
 †Linoproductus phosphaticus
 †Linoproductus prattenianus
 †Linoproductus waagenianus
 †Liosotella
 †Liosotella costata – type locality for species
 †Liosotella irregularis – type locality for species
 †Liosotella opima – type locality for species
 †Liosotella parva – type locality for species
 †Liosotella popei – type locality for species
 †Liosotella rotunda
 †Liosotella spinumbona
 †Liosotella tetragonalis – type locality for species
 †Liosotella texana
 †Liosotella wordensis – type locality for species
 †Liraria
 †Liraria lirata
 †Lirellaria
 †Lirellaria costellata
 †Lirellaria crassa
 †Lirellaria diabloensis
 †Liroceras
 †Liroceras globulare
 †Lissochonetes
 †Lissochonetes geinitzianus
 †Lissochonetes parvisulcatus
 †Lithostrotionella – tentative report
 †Llanoaspis
 †Llanoaspis virginica
 †Llanoceras – type locality for genus
 †Llanoceras gracile – type locality for species
 †Llanocystis – type locality for genus
 †Llanocystis wilbernsensis – type locality for species
 †Lobatannularia
 †Lophonema
 †Lophophyllidium
 †Lophophyllidium absitum – type locality for species
 †Lophophyllidium compressum
 †Lophophyllidium confertum – or unidentified comparable form
 †Lophophyllidium cyathaxoniaforme – type locality for species
 †Lophophyllidium distortum
 †Lophophyllidium dunbari
 †Lophophyllidium erugum – type locality for species
 †Lophophyllidium lanosum – type locality for species
 †Lophophyllidium magnocolumnare – type locality for species
 †Lophophyllidium plummeri – type locality for species
 †Lophophyllidium profundum
 †Lophophyllidium proliferum
 †Lophophyllidium radicosum
 †Lophophyllidium skinneri – type locality for species
 †Lophophyllidium texanum
 †Lophophyllidium vallum – type locality for species
 †Lophophyllidium vidriensis – type locality for species
 †Lophophyllidium westii
 †Lophophyllidium wewokanum
 †Lophotichium
 †Lophotichium dugoutense – type locality for species
 †Lophotichium rotundiseptum – type locality for species
 †Lophotichium simulatum – type locality for species
 †Lowenstamia – type locality for genus
 †Lowenstamia ampla
 †Lowenstamia texana – type locality for species
 †Loxonema – report made of unidentified related form or using admittedly obsolete nomenclature
 †Loxonema inconspicuum – type locality for species
 †Loxophragmus – type locality for genus
 †Loxophragmus ellipticus – type locality for species
 †Luederia – type locality for genus
 †Luederia kempi – type locality for species
 †Luterospongia – type locality for genus
 †Luterospongia texana – type locality for species
 †Lyroschizodus
 †Lyroschizodus oklahomensis
 †Lyroschizodus orbicularis – type locality for species
   †Lysorophus
 †Lysorophus tricarinatus
 †Lytvolasma
 †Lytvolasma aucta – type locality for species

M

 †Mackinneyella
 †Mackinneyella hinganensis – or unidentified related form
 †Mackinneyella praepluriformis – or unidentified comparable form
 †Mackinneyella robustiformis
 †Macluritella
 †Macluritella gyroceras
 †Macluritella uniangulata
 †Macrochilina – report made of unidentified related form or using admittedly obsolete nomenclature
 †Macrochilina modesta – type locality for species
 †Macrodontacanthus – type locality for genus
 †Macrodontacanthus kingi – type locality for species
 †Macroporella
 †Macroporella verticillata – type locality for species
 †Madarosia
 †Madarosia anterolamellata
 †Madarosia pentagona
 †Maeandrostia
 †Maeandrostia kansasensis
 †Manipora
 †Manipora amicarum
 †Manipora magna – type locality for species
 †Manipora trapezoidalis – type locality for species
 †Manzanospira
 †Manzanospira carinata
 †Manzanospira manzanicum
 †Manzanospira wordensis – type locality for species
 †Marathonites
 †Marathonites jpsmithi – type locality for species
 †Marathonites moorei – type locality for species
 †Marathonites vidriensis – type locality for species
 †Marginatia
 †Marginifera
 †Marginifera cristobalensis
 †Marginifera manzanica
 †Marginifera opima
 †Marginifera texana
 †Martinia
 †Martinia causaria
 †Martinia cruenta
 †Martinia exigua
 †Martinia fucina
 †Martinia miranda – type locality for species
 †Martinia nealranchensis
 †Martinia rhomboidalis
 †Martinia wolfcampensis – type locality for species
 †Mastersonia – type locality for genus
 †Mastersonia driverensis – type locality for species
 †Mckittrickella – type locality for genus
 †Mckittrickella pratti – type locality for species
 †Mcqueenoceras
 †Meandrostia
 †Meandrostia tortacloaca
 †Medlicottia
 †Medlicottia arroyoensis – type locality for species
 †Medlicottia chozaensis – type locality for species
 †Medlicottia copei – type locality for species
 †Medlicottia costellifera – type locality for species
 †Medlicottia kingorum – type locality for species
 †Medlicottia milleri – type locality for species
 †Meekella
 †Meekella angustiplicata
 †Meekella attenuata
 †Meekella calathica – type locality for species
 †Meekella caperata – type locality for species
 †Meekella circularis
 †Meekella enormis – type locality for species
 †Meekella hessensis – type locality for species
 †Meekella intermedia
 †Meekella magnifica – type locality for species
 †Meekella mexicana
 †Meekella multilirata – type locality for species
 †Meekella occidentalis – type locality for species
 †Meekella prionota – type locality for species
 †Meekella skenoides
 †Meekella striaticostata
 †Meekella striatocostata
 †Meekella texana – type locality for species
 †Meekopora
 †Meekospira
 †Meekospira choctawensis
 †Meekospira mimiae – type locality for species
 †Meekospira peracuta
 †Megactenopetalus
 †Megactenopetalus kaibabanus
 †Megousia
 †Megousia auriculata
 †Megousia definita – type locality for species
 †Megousia flexuosa
 †Megousia girtyi – type locality for species
 †Megousia mucronata
 †Megousia umbonata
 †Megousia waageniana – type locality for species
 †Merista
 †Merista maccullochensis – type locality for species
 †Mesolobus
  †Metacoceras
 †Metacoceras baylorense – type locality for species
 †Metacoceras cheneyi – type locality for species
 †Metacoceras inconspicuum
 †Metacrimites
 †Metacrimites adamsi – type locality for species
 †Metacrimites defordi – type locality for species
 †Metacrimites marathonensis – type locality for species
 †Metacrimites newelli – type locality for species
 †Metaindocrinus
 †Metaindocrinus cooperi – type locality for species
 †Metalegoceras
 †Metalegoceras aricki – type locality for species
 †Metalegoceras baylorense – type locality for species
 †Metalegoceras schucherti – type locality for species
 †Metaperrinites
 †Metaperrinites cumminsi – type locality for species
 †Metaperrinites vicinus
 †Metapronorites
 †Metapronorites pseudotimorensis
 †Metarmosaurus – type locality for genus
 †Metarmosaurus fossatus – type locality for species
  †Meteoraspis
 †Meteoraspis metra
 †Metoptoma
 †Metoptoma texana – type locality for species
 †Metriolepis – type locality for genus
 †Metriolepis carotica
 †Metriolepis diabloensis
 †Metriolepis exserta
 †Metriolepis irenae
 †Metriolepis larina
 †Metriolepis nabis
 †Metriolepis pedicosa
 †Metriolepis pinea
 †Metriolepis pulvinata – type locality for species
 †Metriolepis scrupea
 †Metriolepis tegulata – type locality for species
 †Metriolepis ziczac – type locality for species
 †Mexicoceras
 †Mexicoceras guadalupense – type locality for species
 †Michelinoceras – tentative report
 †Michelinoceras guadalupense – type locality for species
 †Micraphelia
 †Micraphelia pumilis
 †Micraphelia scitula
 †Micraphelia subalata
  †Micraroter – tentative report
 †Micraroter erythrogeios
 †Microantyx
 †Microantyx botoni
 †Microantyx mudgei
 †Microbaltoceras – type locality for genus
 †Microbaltoceras minore – type locality for species
 †Microdoma
 †Microdoma conicum
 †Microdoma gavinae
 †Microptychis
 †Microptychis insolita – type locality for species
 †Microstaura – type locality for genus
 †Microstaura doliolum
 †Microstaurella – type locality for genus
 †Microstaurella minima – type locality for species
 †Microstaurella parva – type locality for species
 †Millerella
 †Millerella marblensis
 †Millkoninckioceras
 †Millkoninckioceras bibbi
 †Miltonella – type locality for genus
 †Miltonella shupei – type locality for species
 †Minammodytes
 †Minilya
 †Minilya girtyi
 †Minispongia
 †Minispongia constricta – type locality for species
 †Mizzia
 †Mizzia velebitana
 †Monaxoradiata – type locality for genus
 †Monaxoradiata lamina – type locality for species
 †Monodiexodina
 †Monodiexodina bispatulata
 †Monodiexodina linearis – tentative report
 †Monophyllum
 †Monophyllum cassum – type locality for species
 †Monotis – tentative report
 †Moorefieldella
 †Mooreoceras
 †Mooreoceras giganteum – type locality for species
 †Mooreocrinus
 †Mooreocrinus magdalensis – type locality for species
 †Moreauoceras
 †Moreauoceras milleri
 †Morrowcrinus – tentative report
 †Mourlonia
 †Multistella – type locality for genus
 †Multistella porosa
 †Murchisonia
 †Murchisonia gouldi
 †Muriceras – type locality for genus
 †Muriceras anomalum – type locality for species
 †Muriceras curviseptatum – type locality for species
 †Muriceras gracile – type locality for species
 †Muriceras hebetum – type locality for species
 †Muriceras micromurus – type locality for species
 †Muriceras moderatum – type locality for species
 †Muriceras murus – type locality for species
 †Myalina
 †Myalina acutirostris – type locality for species
 †Myalina aviculoides
 †Myalina copei – type locality for species
 †Myalina lamellosa – type locality for species
 †Myalina permiana
 †Myalina plicata – type locality for species
 †Myalina pliopetina – type locality for species
 †Myalina recta – tentative report
 †Myalina squamosa – tentative report
 †Myalina wyomingensis – tentative report
  †Mycterosaurus – type locality for genus
 †Mycterosaurus longiceps – type locality for species
 †Myoconcha
 †Myoconcha costulata – type locality for species

N

 †Nabespecha
 †Nabespecha leonardia – type locality for species
 †Nanobamus – type locality for genus
 †Nanobamus macrorhinus – type locality for species
 †Nasocephalus
 †Nasocephalus flabellatus
 †Nasocephalus nasutus
 †Naticopsis
 †Naticopsis judithae
 †Naticopsis remex
 †Naticopsis shumardi – tentative report
 †Naticopsis transversa – type locality for species
 †Neilsonia
 †Neilsonia laticincta
  †Neldasaurus
 †Neldasaurus wrightae
 †Nemejcopteris
 †Neoaganides
 †Neoaganides grahamensis
  †Neocalamites – or unidentified comparable form
 †Neochonetes
 †Neochonetes costellata – type locality for species
 †Neochonetes granulifer
 †Neochonetes liratus
 †Neochonetes magna
 †Neochonetes meekanus – tentative report
 †Neochonetes parvus
 †Neochonetes transversalis
 †Neochonetes victoriana – type locality for species
 †Neocrimites
 †Neocrimites defordi
 †Neocrimites type locality for species – informal
 †Neodimorphoceras
 †Neodimorphoceras lenticulare
 †Neodimorphoceras oklahomae
 †Neodimorphoceras plummerae – type locality for species
 †Neodimorphoceras texanum
 †Neogeoceras
 †Neogeoceras girtyi
 †Neoglyphioceras
 †Neoglyphioceras entogonum
 †Neoicoceras
 †Neokoninckophyllum
 †Neokoninckophyllum cooperi – type locality for species
 †Neokoninckophyllum deciensis – type locality for species
 †Neokoninckophyllum dunbari – type locality for species
 †Neophricadothyris
 †Neophricadothyris conara – type locality for species
 †Neophricadothyris crassibecca – type locality for species
 †Neophricadothyris transversa
 †Neopopanoceras
 †Neopopanoceras bowmani – type locality for species
 †Neopronorites
 †Neopronorites bakeri – type locality for species
 †Neopronorites boesei
 †Neoshumardites
 †Neoshumardites gaptankensis
  †Neospirifer
 †Neospirifer amphigyus – type locality for species
 †Neospirifer apothescelus – type locality for species
 †Neospirifer bakeri – type locality for species
 †Neospirifer cameratus – tentative report
 †Neospirifer formulosus
 †Neospirifer huecoensis – type locality for species
 †Neospirifer kansasensis
 †Neospirifer mansuetus
 †Neospirifer neali
 †Neospirifer notialis
 †Neospirifer placidus
 †Neospirifer t. – informal
 †Neospirifer triplicatus
 †Neospirifer venezuelensis
 †Neotryplasma
 †Neozeacrinus
 †Neozeacrinus uddeni – type locality for species
  †Neuropteris
 †Neuropteris cordata – tentative report
 †Neuropteris lindahli – or unidentified comparable form
 †Newellites
 †Newellites richardsoni – type locality for species
 †Newellospongia – type locality for genus
 †Newellospongia perforata – type locality for species
 †Nicollidina
 †Nicollidina remscheidensis
 †Nielsenoceras
 †Nielsenoceras skinneri – type locality for species
 †Niviconia – type locality for genus
 †Niviconia abrupta
 †Niviconia globosa
 †Norwoodia
 †Norwoodia quadrangularis
 †Nothopindax
 †Nothopindax egregius
 †Notothyris
 †Notothyris gillilandensis
 †Notothyris planiplicata
 †Notothyris venusta – type locality for species
 †Novaculapermia – type locality for genus
 †Novaculapermia boydi – type locality for species
 †Novlepatella
 †Novlepatella beedei – type locality for species
 †Novlepatella parrishi
 †Novlepatella patella – type locality for species
 †Novoameura
 †Novoameura vitrumons – type locality for species
 †Nucleospira
 †Nucleospira cunctata
  Nucula – report made of unidentified related form or using admittedly obsolete nomenclature
 Nuculana
 †Nuculavus
 †Nuculavus levatiformis
 †Nuculavus okawensis – or unidentified related form
 †Nuculopsis
 †Nuculopsis girtyi
 †Nudauris
 †Nudauris convexa
 †Nudauris diabloensis
 †Nudauris enigmatica – type locality for species
 †Nudauris linospina – type locality for species
 †Nudauris reticulata – type locality for species
 †Nudauris splendens – type locality for species
 †Nudauris transversa
 †Nudauris tribulosa
 †Nudauris whitei
 †Nuia
 †Nuia siberica
 †Nybyoceras
 †Nybyoceras montoyense
 †Nyctopora
 †Nyctopora mutabilis – type locality for species
 †Nyctopora nondescripta – type locality for species

O

 †Obliquipecten
 †Obliquipecten granti
 †Ochmazochiton – type locality for genus
 †Ochmazochiton comptus – type locality for species
 †Odonopteris
 †Odontopteris
 †Odontopteris conferta
 †Odontopteris fischeri
 †Odontopteris genuina
 †Odontopteris neuropteroides
 †Odontopteris osmundaeformis – or unidentified comparable form
 †Oistodus
 †Oldhamina – tentative report
 †Olenus
 †Oligorthis
 †Oligorthis arbucklensis
 †Ombonia
 †Ombonia guadalupensis
 †Ombonia invecta
 †Omphalotrochus
 †Omphalotrochus alleni – type locality for species
 †Omphalotrochus cochisensis – type locality for species
 †Omphalotrochus hessensis – type locality for species
 †Omphalotrochus obtusispira – type locality for species
 †Omphalotrochus spinosus – type locality for species
 †Omphalotrochus wolfcampensis – type locality for species
 †Oncosarina
 †Oncosarina rotunda
 †Oncosarina spinicostata – type locality for species
 †Oncosarina whitei
 †Oneotoceras
 †Onniella
 †Onniella plicata – type locality for species
 †Onniella quadrata
 †Onychochilus
  †Ophiacodon – type locality for genus
 †Ophiacodon major – type locality for species
 †Ophiacodon retroversus – type locality for species
 †Ophiacodon uniformis – type locality for species
 †Ophileta
 †Ophileta polygyratus
 †Ophileta rotuliformis
 †Opisthotreta
 †Opisthotreta depressa
 †Orbicoelia
 †Orbicoelia guadalupensis
 †Orbicoelia inflata
 †Orbicoelia tholiaphor – type locality for species
 †Orbicoelia tumibilis
 †Orbiculoidea
 †Orbiculoidea missouriensis
 †Ormoceras
 †Ormoceras dartoni
  †Orodus
 †Orodus corrugatus – type locality for species
 †Orospira
 †Orthacanthus
 †Orthacanthus compressus
 †Orthacanthus texensis
 †Orthisina – report made of unidentified related form or using admittedly obsolete nomenclature
 †Orthoceracone
 †Orthograptus
 †Orthograptus fastigatus
 †Orthograptus quadrimucronatus
 †Orthograptus thorsteinssoni
 †Orthomyalina
 †Orthomyalina subquadrata
 †Orthonema
 †Orthonema paedice – type locality for species
 †Orthonema paxillus – type locality for species
 †Orthonema salteri
 †Orthonema striatonodosum
 †Orthonema telescopiforme – type locality for species
 †Orthonychia
 †Orthonychia bowsheri – type locality for species
 †Orthotetella
 †Orthotetella wolfcampensis – type locality for species
 †Orthotetes
 †Orthotetes mutabilis – or unidentified comparable form
 †Orthothetina
 †Orthotichia
 †Orthotichia hueconiana – type locality for species
 †Orthotichia irregularis
 †Orthotichia kozlowskii – type locality for species
 †Orthotichia newelli – type locality for species
 †Ossimimus – type locality for genus
 †Ossimimus robustus
 †Ostodolepis – type locality for genus
 †Ostodolepis brevispinatus – type locality for species
 †Oulodus
 †Oulodus cristagalli – tentative report
 †Ovatia
 †Oxyprora
 †Oxyprora capitanensis – type locality for species
 †Oxyprora missouriensis
 †Ozarkina
 †Ozarkina typica
 †Ozarkodina
 †Ozarkodina bohemica
 †Ozarkodina wurmi – tentative report
 †Ozawainella – tentative report
 †Ozawainella inflata – type locality for species

P

 †Pachylyroceras
 †Pachylyroceras cloudi
 †Pachylyroceras newsomi
 †Padgettia
 †Padgettia readi – type locality for species
 †Paladin
 †Paladin helmsensis
 †Palaeanodonta
 †Palaeocaudina
 †Palaeocaudina kansasensis
 †Palaeoceras – type locality for genus
 †Palaeoceras mutabile – type locality for species
 †Palaeoceras undulatum – type locality for species
 †Palaeogeminella
 †Palaeogeminella folkii
 †Palaeoneilo
 †Palaeoneilo taffiana
  †Palaeoniscus – tentative report
 †Palaeophyllum
 †Palaeophyllum cateniforme – type locality for species
 †Palaeophyllum gracile – type locality for species
 †Palaeophyllum margaretae – type locality for species
 †Palaeophyllum thomi
 †Palaeostylus
 †Paleochiridota
 †Paleochiridota plummerae
 †Paleochiridota radiata – type locality for species
 †Paleochiridota terquemi – type locality for species
 †Paleochiridota waylandensis – type locality for species
 †Paleofavosites
 †Paleofavosites kuellmeri – type locality for species
 †Paleofavosites prayi – type locality for species
 †Paleofavosites sparsus – type locality for species
 †Paleowaagia
 †Paleowaagia cooperi – type locality for species
 †Paleyoldia
 †Paleyoldia glabra
 †Panderodus
 †Panderodus equicostatus
 †Panderodus panderi
 †Panderodus unicostatus
 †Panduralimulus – type locality for genus
 †Panduralimulus babcocki – type locality for species
   †Pantylus – type locality for genus
 †Pantylus coicodus – type locality for species
 †Pantylus cordatus – type locality for species
 †Parabolinella
 †Parabolinella triarthroides – tentative report
 †Parabolinella triathroides – tentative report
 †Paraboultonia – type locality for genus
 †Paraboultonia splendens – type locality for species
 †Paraceltites
 †Paraceltites altudensis – type locality for species
 †Paraceltites elegans
 †Paraceltites multicostatus – type locality for species
 †Paraceltites ornatus
 †Paraconularia
 †Paraconularia leonardensis
 †Paracravenoceras
 †Paracravenoceras barnettense – type locality for species
 †Paracravenoceras ozarkense
 †Paraduplophyllum
 †Paraduplophyllum amplexoides – type locality for species
 †Paraduplophyllum multiplicatum – type locality for species
 †Paraduplophyllum nealranchense – type locality for species
 †Paraduplophyllum oppositum – type locality for species
 †Paraduplophyllum tubaeformis – type locality for species
 †Paraduplophyllum vermiculare – type locality for species
 †Parafenestralia
 †Parafenestralia gregalis – or unidentified comparable form
 †Parafusulina
 †Parafusulina amoena – type locality for species
 †Paragastrioceras
 †Paragastrioceras type locality for species – informal
 †Paragoniozona
 †Paragoniozona granulostriata
 †Paragoniozona multilirata – or unidentified comparable form
 †Paragoniozona nodolirata – or unidentified comparable form
 †Paraheritschioides
 †Paraheritschioides californiense
 †Parahystricurus
 †Parajuresania
 †Parajuresania nebrascensis
 †Paralegoceras
 †Paralegoceras texanum – type locality for species
 †Parallelodon
 †Parallelodon multistriatus
 †Paralleynia – tentative report
 †Paralleynia acclinis – type locality for species
 †Paramphicrinus
 †Paranorella
 †Paranorella aquilonia
 †Paranorella comptula
 †Paraparchites
 †Paraparchites marathonensis – type locality for species
 †Parapenascoceras
 †Parapenascoceras sanandreasense
 †Paraperrinites
 †Paraperrinites subcumminsi – type locality for species
 †Paraplethopeltis
 †Parapolypora
 †Parapolypora daurica – or unidentified comparable form
 †Parapolypora novella – or unidentified comparable form
 †Parapolypora sparsa – or unidentified related form
 †Parareteograptus
 †Paraschistoceras
 †Paraschistoceras costiferum – type locality for species
 †Paraschistoceras hildrethi
 †Paraschistoceras reticulatum
 †Paraschizodus
 †Paraschizodus rothi – type locality for species
 †Paraschwagerina
 †Paraschwagerina shuleri – type locality for species
 †Parashumardites
 †Parashumardites fornicatus – type locality for species
 †Parashumardites sellardsi – type locality for species
 †Parashumardites senex
 †Paraspiriferina
 †Paraspiriferina amoena
 †Paraspiriferina billingsi
 †Paraspiriferina cellulana – type locality for species
 †Paraspiriferina evax – type locality for species
 †Paraspiriferina laqueata – type locality for species
 †Paraspiriferina paginata
 †Paraspiriferina pulchra
 †Paraspiriferina rotundata – type locality for species
 †Paraspiriferina sapinea
 †Paraspiriferina setulosa
 †Paraspiriferina sulcata
 †Parauvanella
 †Parauvanella minima
 †Parenteletes
 †Parenteletes cooperi
 †Parenteletes superbus – type locality for species
 †Pariotichus – type locality for genus
 †Pariotichus brachyops – type locality for species
 †Parioxys – type locality for genus
 †Parioxys bolli – type locality for species
 †Parioxys ferricolus – type locality for species
 †Parulocrinus
 †Parulocrinus americanus – type locality for species
 Patella – tentative report
 †Patellilabia
 †Patellilabia junior – type locality for species
 †Patellostium
 †Patellostium ourayensis
 †Paucipora
 †Paucipora subborealis – or unidentified comparable form
 †Paucispinifera
 †Paucispinifera auriculata
 †Paucispinifera comancheana – type locality for species
 †Paucispinifera costellata – type locality for species
 †Paucispinifera guadalupensis
 †Paucispinifera indentata – type locality for species
 †Paucispinifera intermedia
 †Paucispinifera latidorsata
 †Paucispinifera magnispina
 †Paucispinifera parasulcata
 †Paucispinifera quadrata – type locality for species
 †Paucispinifera rara
 †Paucispinifera rectangulata
 †Paucispinifera spinosa
 †Paucispinifera sulcata – type locality for species
 †Paucispinifera suspecta
 †Paucispinifera transversa – type locality for species
 †Paucispinifera tumida
  †Pecopteris
 †Pecopteris arborescens
 †Pecopteris candolleana
 †Pecopteris densifolia – tentative report
 †Pecopteris grandifolia
 †Pecopteris hemitelioides
 †Pecopteris tenuinervis
 †Pecopteris unita
 †Pedanochiton – type locality for genus
 †Pedanochiton discomptus – type locality for species
 †Pedavis
 †Pedavis biexoramus
 †Pegmavalvula
 †Pegmavalvula delicata – type locality for species
 †Pegmavalvula gloveri – type locality for species
  †Pelodosotis – type locality for genus
 †Pelodosotis elongatum – type locality for species
 †Peniculauris
 †Peniculauris bassi
 †Peniculauris costata – type locality for species
 †Peniculauris imitata
 †Peniculauris ivesi
 †Peniculauris peniculifera
 †Peniculauris subcostata – type locality for species
 †Peniculauris transversa
 †Penniretepora
 †Pennoceras
 †Pennoceras seamani – type locality for species
 †Perimestocrinus
 †Perimestocrinus excavatus – type locality for species
 †Perimestocrinus moseleyi – type locality for species
 †Peripetoceras
 †Peripetoceras bridgeportense – type locality for species
 †Peritrochia – type locality for genus
 †Peritrochia erebus
 †Permanomia
 †Permanomia texana – type locality for species
 †Permoconcha
 †Permoconcha conica – type locality for species
 †Permoconcha tabulata – type locality for species
 †Permocorynella
 †Permocorynella capitanense – type locality for species
 †Permophorus
 †Permophorus albequus
 †Permophorus lunulus – type locality for species
 †Permophorus mexicanus
 †Permophricodothyris
 †Permophricodothyris bullata – type locality for species
 †Permophricodothyris cordata – type locality for species
 †Pernopecten
 †Pernopecten obliquus
 †Pernopecten symmetricus
 †Pernopecten yini
 †Perrinites
 †Perrinites gouldi – type locality for species
 †Perrinites hilli – type locality for species
 †Perrinites tardus – type locality for species
 †Perrinites vidriensis
 †Peruvispira
 †Peruvispira delicata
  †Petalodus
 †Petasmaia
 †Petasmaia expansa
 †Petasmatherus
 †Petasmatherus depressus
 †Petasmatherus mundus
 †Petasmatherus nitidus – type locality for species
 †Petasmatherus opulus – type locality for species
 †Petasmatherus pumilus – type locality for species
 †Petasmatherus pusillus
 †Petasmatherus recticardinatus
 †Petrocrania
 †Petrocrania diabloensis – type locality for species
 †Petrocrania exasperata
 †Petrocrania modesta
 †Petrocrania septifera – type locality for species
 †Petrocrania teretis – type locality for species
 †Phaneroceras
 †Phaneroceras compressum
 †Phaneroceras lenticulare – type locality for species
 †Phanerotrema – tentative report
 †Pharkidonotus
 †Pharkidonotus harrodi
 †Pharkidonotus megalius – or unidentified related form
 †Pharkidonotus percarinatus
 †Pharkidonotus westi – type locality for species
 †Phasmatocycas
 †Phasmatocycas spectabilis – type locality for species
 †Phestia
 †Phestia bellistriata
 †Philhedra
   †Phlegethontia – tentative report
 †Phonerpeton
 †Phonerpeton pricei – type locality for species
 †Phonerpeton whitei – type locality for species
 †Phrenophoria
 †Phrenophoria anterocostata
 †Phrenophoria bicostata
 †Phrenophoria compressa
 †Phrenophoria corpulenta
 †Phrenophoria depressa
 †Phrenophoria incomitata
 †Phrenophoria irregularis
 †Phrenophoria nesiotes
 †Phrenophoria nudumbona – type locality for species
 †Phrenophoria pentagonalis – type locality for species
 †Phrenophoria perplexa
 †Phrenophoria pinguiformis
 †Phrenophoria pinguis – type locality for species
 †Phrenophoria planifrons
 †Phrenophoria planiventra
 †Phrenophoria repugnans
 †Phrenophoria subcarinata – type locality for species
 †Phrenophoria ventricosa – type locality for species
 †Phrenophoria vetula
 †Phricodothyris
 †Phricodothyris catatona
 †Phricodothyris guadalupensis
 †Phymatopleura
 †Phymatopleura brazoensis
 †Phymatopleura nodosa
 †Pileochiton – type locality for genus
 †Pileochiton cancellus – type locality for species
 †Pileolites – type locality for genus
 †Pileolites baccatus – type locality for species
 †Piloceras
   †Pinnularia
 †Pintoceras – type locality for genus
 †Pintoceras postvenatum – type locality for species
 †Pirasocrinus
 †Pirasocrinus invaginatus – type locality for species
 †Pithodea
 †Pithodea tornatilis – or unidentified comparable form
  †Plaesiomys
 †Plaesiomys bellistriatus
 †Plaesiomys subquadrata
 †Plagioglypta
 †Plagioglypta annulostriata
 †Plagioglypta girtyi
 †Plagiostoma – report made of unidentified related form or using admittedly obsolete nomenclature
 †Plagiostoma deltoideum
 †Planispina
 †Planispina conida
 †Planotectus
 †Planotectus cymbellatus – type locality for species
   †Platyceras
  †Platyhystrix – or unidentified comparable form
 †Platysaccus
 †Platysaccus papilionis
 †Platysaccus saarensis
 †Platyzona
 †Platyzona anguispira – type locality for species
 †Platyzona cancellata – type locality for species
 †Platyzona pagoda – type locality for species
 †Platyzona rotunda
 †Plaxocrinus
 †Plaxocrinus laxus – type locality for species
 †Plaxocrinus oeconomicus – type locality for species
 †Plectelasma
 †Plectelasma dubium
 †Plectelasma guadalupense
 †Plectelasma kingi
 †Plectelasma nitidum
 †Plectelasma planidorsatum
 †Plectospira
 †Plectospira problematica
 †Plectronoceras
 †Plectronoceras exile – type locality for species
 †Plerodiffia – type locality for genus
 †Plerodiffia eaglebuttensis – type locality for species
 †Plethospira
 †Plethospira rotunda – type locality for species
 †Pleurelasma
 †Pleurelasma costatum
  †Pleuronautilus
 †Pleuronautilus cooperi – type locality for species
 †Pleuronautilus gregarius – type locality for species
 †Pleuronautilus megaporus – type locality for species
 †Pleuronautilus mutatus – type locality for species
 †Pleuronautilus praecursor
 †Pleuronautilus shumardianus
 †Pleurophorus – report made of unidentified related form or using admittedly obsolete nomenclature
 †Pleurophorus delawarensis – type locality for species
 †Pleurophorus occidentalis
  Pleurotomaria – report made of unidentified related form or using admittedly obsolete nomenclature
 †Pleurotomaria arenaria – type locality for species
 †Pleurotomaria carinifera – type locality for species
 †Pleurotomaria discoidea – type locality for species
 †Pleurotomaria elderi – type locality for species
 †Pleurotomaria halliana – type locality for species
 †Pleurotomaria mica – type locality for species
 †Pleurotomaria neglecta – type locality for species
 †Pleurotomaria perornata – type locality for species
 †Pleurotomaria planulata – type locality for species
 †Pleurotomaria proutiana – type locality for species
 †Pleurotomaria putilla
 †Pleurotomaria richardsoni – type locality for species
 †Plicochonetes
 †Plicochonetes ornatus – or unidentified comparable form
 †Plummeroceras
 †Plummeroceras plummeri – type locality for species
 †Poacordaites
 †Poacordaites tenuifolius – or unidentified comparable form
 †Podozamites
 †Poikilosakos
 †Poikilosakos informis
 †Poikilosakos petaloides
 †Polidevcia
 †Polidevcia bellistriata
 †Polyacrodus
 †Polyacrodus lapalomensis – type locality for species
 †Polyacrodus ritchiei – type locality for species
 †Polyacrodus wichitaensis
 †Polyacrodus zideki – type locality for species
 †Polydiexodina
 †Polydiexodina shumardi
 †Polylophidium – type locality for genus
 †Polylophidium discus – type locality for species
 †Polymorpharia
 †Polymorpharia polymorpha
 †Polypora
 †Polypora andina
 †Polypora balkhaschensiformis
 †Polypora bassleri – or unidentified related form
 †Polypora crassa – or unidentified comparable form
 †Polypora darashamensis – or unidentified comparable form
 †Polypora elliptica – or unidentified related form
 †Polypora fujimotoi – or unidentified related form
 †Polypora halliana – or unidentified related form
 †Polypora hirsuta
 †Polypora hivatchensis – or unidentified related form
 †Polypora irregularis – or unidentified comparable form
 †Polypora keyserlingi – or unidentified related form
 †Polypora mexicana
 †Polypora nodocarinata
 †Polypora soyanensis
 †Polypora virga – or unidentified comparable form
 †Polypora vitiosa – or unidentified related form
 †Polyporella
 †Polyporella perturbata
 †Polyporella ulakhanensis – or unidentified comparable form
 †Polysiphon – type locality for genus
 †Polysiphon mirabilis – type locality for species
 †Polysiphonaria – type locality for genus
 †Polysiphonaria flabellata – type locality for species
 †Polysiphonaria flabellatum
 †Pontisia
 †Pontisia costata
 †Pontisia franklinensis
 †Pontisia kingi – type locality for species
 †Pontisia longicosta
 †Pontisia magnicostata
 †Pontisia nanas
 †Pontisia parva
 †Pontisia robusta
 †Pontisia stehlii – type locality for species
 †Pontisia truncata
 †Pontisia ventricola
 †Pontisia wolfcampensis
 †Popanoceras
 †Popanoceras walcotti – type locality for species
 †Posidonia
 †Pragnellia
 †Pragnellia delicatula – type locality for species
 †Prehoffmannia – type locality for genus
 †Prehoffmannia milleri – type locality for species
 †Preperonidella
 †Preperonidella delicata
 †Preperonidella rigbyi
 †Preshumardites
 †Preshumardites gaptankensis
 †Preshumardites illinoisensis
 †Preshumardites stainbrooki – type locality for species
 Priscopedatus
 †Priscopedatus bullatus – type locality for species
 †Priscopedatus buno – type locality for species
 †Priscopedatus radiatus – type locality for species
 †Priscopedatus stellatus – type locality for species
 †Procostatoria – type locality for genus
 †Procostatoria cooperi
 †Procostatoria gloveri – type locality for species
 †Procostatoria sexaradiata
 †Procostatoria sexradiata
 †Prodentalium
 †Prodentalium canna
 †Prodentalium raymondi
 †Productina
 †Productina sampsoni
 †Productus
 †Productus calhounianus – tentative report
 †Productus hermosanus
 †Productus mexicanus – type locality for species
 †Productus norwoodii – tentative report
 †Productus semistriatus
 †Progyrolepis
 †Progyrolepis tricessimalaris – type locality for species
 †Properrinites
 †Properrinites bakeri
 †Properrinites boesei – type locality for species
 †Properrinites type locality for species – informal
 †Propinacoceras
 †Proplina
 †Propopanoceras
 †Propopanoceras postsimense
 †Prorichthofenia
 †Proshumardites
 †Proshumardites primus
 †Prostacheoceras
 †Prostacheoceras skinneri – type locality for species
 †Prostacheoceras type locality for species – informal
 †Prothalassoceras
 †Prothalassoceras caddoense – type locality for species
 †Prothalassoceras kingorum
 †Prothalassoceras welleri – type locality for species
 †Protocaptorhinus – type locality for genus
 †Protocaptorhinus pricei – type locality for species
 †Protoretepora
 †Protoretepora ampla – or unidentified comparable form
 †Protorothyris – type locality for genus
 †Protorothyris archeri – type locality for species
 †Protowentzelella
 †Protowentzelella cystosa
 †Protowentzelella kunthi
 †Protrete – type locality for genus
 †Protrete texanus – type locality for species
 †Protrochiscolithus
 †Protrochiscolithus alemanensis – type locality for species
 †Prouddenites
 †Prouddenites primus – type locality for species
    †Psaronius
 †Pseudagnostus
 †Pseudagnostus nordicus
 †Pseudoalbaillella
 †Pseudoalbaillella cona – type locality for species
 †Pseudoalbaillella fusiformis – or unidentified related form
 †Pseudoalbaillella globosus
 †Pseudoalbaillella scalprata
 †Pseudodielasma – type locality for genus
 †Pseudodielasma brilli
 †Pseudodielasma gibberum
 †Pseudodielasma globulum
 †Pseudodielasma lobatum
 †Pseudodielasma magnum
 †Pseudodielasma minor
 †Pseudodielasma ovatum – type locality for species
 †Pseudodielasma perplexa – type locality for species
 †Pseudodielasma pingue
 †Pseudodielasma pinyonense
 †Pseudodielasma plicatum
 †Pseudodielasma scutulatum – type locality for species
 †Pseudodielasma subcirculare
 †Pseudodielasma sulcatum
 †Pseudofusulina
 †Pseudofusulina powwowensis
 †Pseudogastrioceras
 †Pseudogastrioceras texanum – type locality for species
 †Pseudohystricurus
 †Pseudoleptodus – type locality for genus
 †Pseudoleptodus annosus
 †Pseudoleptodus conicus
 †Pseudoleptodus cucullatus
 †Pseudoleptodus getawayensis – type locality for species
 †Pseudoleptodus giganteus
 †Pseudoleptodus grandis
 †Pseudoleptodus granulosus
 †Pseudoleptodus guadalupensis – type locality for species
 †Pseudoleptodus lepidus
 †Pseudoleptodus nodosus
 †Pseudoleptodus primitivus
  †Pseudomelania – report made of unidentified related form or using admittedly obsolete nomenclature
 †Pseudomonotis
 †Pseudomonotis acinetus
 †Pseudomonotis hawni
 †Pseudomonotis likharevi
 †Pseudomonotis speluncaria – tentative report
 †Pseudomonotis sublaevis
 †Pseudooneotodus
 †Pseudooneotodus beckmanni
 †Pseudooneotodus bicornis
 †Pseudooneotodus linguicornis
 †Pseudoparalegoceras
 †Pseudoparalegoceras bellilineatum
 †Pseudoparalegoceras brazoense – type locality for species
 †Pseudopronorites
 †Pseudopronorites arkansiensis
 †Pseudopronorites llanoensis – type locality for species
 †Pseudorthoceras
 †Pseudorthoceras knoxense
 †Pseudoschwagerina
 †Pseudoschwagerina beedei
 †Pseudoschwagerina geiseri
 †Pseudoschwagerina gerontica
 †Pseudoschwagerina uddeni
 †Pseudovidrioceras
 †Pseudovidrioceras dunbari
 †Pseudovirgula – type locality for genus
 †Pseudovirgula tenuis – type locality for species
 †Pseudovoltzia
 †Pseudovoltzia liebeana
 †Pseudowannerophyllum
 †Pseudowannerophyllum solidum – type locality for species
 †Pseudozaphrentoides
 †Pseudozaphrentoides ordinatus – type locality for species
 †Pseudozygopleura
 †Pseudozygopleura belli – type locality for species
 †Pseudozygopleura moorei
 †Pseudozygopleura multicostata
 †Pseudozygopleura obtusicacuminis
 †Pseudozygopleura scitula
 †Pseudozygopleura type locality for species – informal
 †Psilocamara – type locality for genus
 †Psilocamara hesperia
 †Psilocamara renfroarum – type locality for species
 Pteria – report made of unidentified related form or using admittedly obsolete nomenclature
 †Pteria richardsoni
 †Pteria squamifera – type locality for species
 †Pterinopectinella
 †Pterinopectinella spinifera
 †Pterocephalia
 †Pterochiton
 †Pterochiton newelli – type locality for species
 †Pterochiton spatulatus
 †Pterochiton texanus – type locality for species
 †Pteronites
 †Ptilotorhynchus
 †Ptilotorhynchus delicatum
 †Ptychocarpus
 †Ptygmactrum – type locality for genus
 †Ptygmactrum acutum
 †Ptygmactrum angulatum
 †Ptygmactrum depressum
 †Ptygmactrum extensum – type locality for species
 †Ptygmactrum mordicum
 †Ptygmactrum spiculatum – type locality for species
 †Pudoproetus
 †Pudoproetus chappelensis
 †Pugnax
 †Pugnax osagensis
 †Pugnoides
 †Pugnoides bidentatus
 †Pugnoides elegans
 †Pugnoides shumardianus
 †Pugnoides swallovianus
 †Pugnoides texanus
 †Pulchratia
 †Pulchratia symmetricus
 †Pulchrilamina
 †Pulchrilamina spinosa
 †Pulsatospongia – type locality for genus
 †Pulsatospongia obconica – type locality for species
 †Punctospirifer
 †Punctospirifer billingsii
 †Punctospirifer kentuckensis
 †Pustula
 †Pustula semipunctata

Q

 †Quadratia
 †Quadratia egregia – type locality for species
 †Quadrochonetes
 †Quadrochonetes girtyi – type locality for species
 †Quadrochonetes praecursor
 †Quasicaecilia – type locality for genus
 †Quasicaecilia texana – type locality for species

R

 †Radiotrabeculopora
 †Radiotrabeculopora virga – type locality for species
 †Rallacosta
 †Rallacosta actina
 †Rallacosta imporcata
 †Rallacosta laminata
 †Rallacosta xystica
 †Ramavectus
 †Ramavectus diabloensis
 †Ramipora
 †Ramipora hochstetteri – or unidentified related form
 †Ramosothalamiella – type locality for genus
 †Ramosothalamiella divaricata – type locality for species
 †Rananasus
 †Raphistomina
 †Rasettia
 †Rasettia capax – or unidentified comparable form
 †Rauserella
 †Rauserella erratica
 †Rayonnoceras
 †Rayonnoceras huecoense – type locality for species
 †Rectograptus
 †Rectograptus amplexicaulis
 †Regrantia
 †Regrantia linoproductiformis
 †Reiszorhinus – type locality for genus
 †Reiszorhinus olsoni – type locality for species
 †Renalcis
  †Retaria – report made of unidentified related form or using admittedly obsolete nomenclature
 †Retaria leplayi – tentative report
 †Reteporidra
 †Reteporidra orientalis – or unidentified comparable form
 †Retichonetes – tentative report
 †Retichonetes gibberulus – type locality for species
 †Reticularia
 †Reticularia cooperensis
 †Reticulariina
 †Reticulariina bufala
 †Reticulariina cerina – type locality for species
 †Reticulariina craticula
 †Reticulariina echinata
 †Reticulariina girtyi
 †Reticulariina hueconiana – type locality for species
 †Reticulariina impressa
 †Reticulariina laxa
 †Reticulariina newelli
 †Reticulariina phoxa
 †Reticulariina powwowensis
 †Reticulariina pristina – type locality for species
 †Reticulariina pusilla
 †Reticulariina roscida
 †Reticulariina senticosa
 †Reticulariina strigosa
 †Reticulariina subulata
 †Reticulariina tetrica
 †Reticulariina venustula
 †Reticulariina welleri
 †Reticulatia
 †Reticulatia americana
 †Reticulatia huecoensis – type locality for species
 †Reticulatia robusta
 †Retispira
 †Retispira bellireticulata
 †Retispira fragilis – type locality for species
 †Retispira kansasensis
 †Retispira lyelli – type locality for species
 †Retispira meekiana
 †Retispira modesta
 †Retispira texana – type locality for species
 †Rhabdiferoceras
 †Rhabdomeson
 †Rhabdomeson bellum
 †Rhabdotocochlis
 †Rhabdotocochlis type locality for species – informal
 †Rhamnaria – type locality for genus
 †Rhamnaria eximia
 †Rhamnaria grandis
 †Rhamnaria kingorum – type locality for species
 †Rhamnaria rectangulata
 †Rhamnaria shumardi
 †Rhamnaria sulcata
 †Rhamnaria tenuispinosa – type locality for species
 †Rhamnaria vinnula
 †Rhipidomella
 †Rhipidomella carbonaria
 †Rhipidomella hessensis – type locality for species
 †Rhipidomella hispidula – type locality for species
 †Rhipidomella miscella
 †Rhipidomella perminuta
 †Rhombopora
 †Rhombopora lepidodendroides
  †Rhynchonella – report made of unidentified related form or using admittedly obsolete nomenclature
 †Rhynchonella guadalupae – type locality for species
 †Rhynchonella texana
 †Rhynchopora
 †Rhynchopora dossena
 †Rhynchopora guadalupensis
 †Rhynchopora hebetata
 †Rhynchopora illinoisensis
 †Rhynchopora molina – type locality for species
 †Rhynchopora palumbula – type locality for species
 †Rhynchopora patula
 †Rhynchopora sansabensis – type locality for species
 †Rhynchopora sphenoides
 †Rhynchopora taylori
 †Rhynchopora tenera
 †Rhynchotrema
 †Rhynchotrema iowense
 †Rhytiophora
 †Rhytiophora blairi – or unidentified comparable form
 †Rhytiophora calhounensis
 †Rhytisia
 †Rhytisia rugosa
 †Ribeiria
 †Ribeiria calcifera
 †Richardsonites
 †Richardsonites richardsonianus
 †Rigbyella
 †Rigbyella girtyi – type locality for species
 †Rigrantia
 †Rigrantia costella
 †Rigrantia hessensis – type locality for species
 †Rigrantia planumbona
 †Rigrantia regularis
 †Rioceras
 †Rioceras dartoni – type locality for species
 †Rioceras tubulare – type locality for species
 †Rioceras wellsi – type locality for species
 †Roadoceras
 †Roadoceras beedei – type locality for species
 †Roadoceras roadense – type locality for species
 †Roemerella
 †Roemerella gigantissima – type locality for species
 †Romeria – type locality for genus
 †Romeria prima – type locality for species
 †Romeria texana – type locality for species
 †Rota
 †Rota martini
 †Rotaia
 †Rothianiscus – type locality for genus
 †Rothianiscus multidonta – type locality for species
 †Roundyella
 †Roundyella dorsopapillosa – type locality for species
  †Rubeostratilia – type locality for genus
 †Rubeostratilia texensis – type locality for species
 †Rugaria
 †Rugaria crassa
 †Rugaria hessensis – type locality for species
 †Rugaria molengraaffi – tentative report
 †Rugatia
 †Rugatia convexa
 †Rugatia incurva
 †Rugatia incurvata – type locality for species
 †Rugatia mckeei
 †Rugatia occidentalis
 †Rugatia paraindica
 †Rugosochonetes
 †Rugosochonetes burlingtonensis
 †Russellites
 †Russellites taeniata
 †Ruthenoceras – report made of unidentified related form or using admittedly obsolete nomenclature

S

 †Saffordophyllum
 †Saffordophyllum newcombae – type locality for species
 †Sagenodus
 †Sagittoceras – tentative report
 †Sagittoceras hathawayanum – or unidentified comparable form
 †Sallya
 †Sallya bicincta
 †Sallya linsa – type locality for species
 †Sallya striata – type locality for species
 †Salvadorea
 †Salvadorea kingae
 †Samaropsis
 †Sandolasma – tentative report
 †Sandolasma cooperi – type locality for species
 †Sandrewia – type locality for genus
 †Sandrewia texana – type locality for species
 †Sanniolus – type locality for genus
 †Sanniolus sigmoides – type locality for species
 †Saportaea – tentative report
 †Sarganostega
 †Sarganostega murata
 †Sarganostega pressa
 †Sarganostega prisca
 †Sarganostega pyramidalis – type locality for species
 †Sarganostega transversalis
  †Sauropleura
 †Sauropleura bairdi – type locality for species
 †Scacchinella
 †Scacchinella americana
 †Scacchinella exasperata – type locality for species
 †Scacchinella gigantea
 †Scacchinella primitiva
 †Scacchinella titan – type locality for species
 †Scacchinella triangulata – type locality for species
 †Scaldia
 †Scapanops – type locality for genus
 †Scapanops neglecta – type locality for species
 †Scapharina
 †Scapharina levis
 †Scapharina quadrata
 †Scapharina rugosa
 †Sceletonia
 †Sceletonia crassa
 †Scenesia
 †Scenesia extensa
 †Schaefferichthys – type locality for genus
 †Schaefferichthys leudersensis – type locality for species
 †Scheiella – type locality for genus
 †Scheiella thesaurium – type locality for species
 †Scheiia
 †Scheiia tuberosa
 †Schematochiton
 †Schematochiton arthurcooperi
 †Schistoceras
 †Schistoceras missouriense – type locality for species
 †Schizodus
 †Schizodus canalis
 †Schizodus ovatus
 †Schizodus securus – type locality for species
 †Schizodus supaiensis
 †Schizodus texanus – type locality for species
 †Schizodus ulrichi – or unidentified comparable form
 †Schizodus wyomingensis
 †Schizograptus
 †Schizopea
 †Schizophoria
 †Schubertella
 †Schubertella kingi
 †Schuchertella – tentative report
 †Schuchertella subvexa
 †Schwagerina
 †Schwagerina bellula
 †Schwagerina crassitectoria
 †Schwagerina davisi
 †Schwagerina diversiformis
 †Schwagerina emaciata
 †Schwagerina eolata
 †Schwagerina franklinensis
 †Schwagerina grandensis – or unidentified related form
 †Schwagerina huecoensis
 †Schwagerina knighti
 †Schwagerina menziesi – type locality for species
 †Schwagerina nelsoni
 †Schwagerina neolata
 †Schwagerina thompsoni – tentative report
 †Schyroconcha
 †Schyroconcha spinosa – or unidentified related form
  †Secodontosaurus
 †Secodontosaurus obtusidens – type locality for species
 †Secodontosaurus willistoni – type locality for species
 †Sedenticellula
 †Sedenticellula sacra
 †Sedgwickia
 †Sedgwickia topekaensis
 †Sellardsicrinus – tentative report
 †Semipetasus – type locality for genus
 †Semipetasus signatus – type locality for species
 †Septimyalina
 †Septimyalina burmai
 †Septimyalina perattenuata
 †Septopora
 †Septopora biserialis – or unidentified comparable form
 †Septopora blanda – or unidentified comparable form
 †Septopora cestriensis – or unidentified comparable form
 †Septopora flabellata – or unidentified comparable form
 †Septopora lineata – or unidentified related form
 †Septopora orientalis
 †Septopora pinnata – or unidentified related form
 †Septopora quasiorientalis – or unidentified comparable form
 †Septopora robusta – or unidentified related form
 †Septopora spinulosa – or unidentified related form
  Serpula – tentative report
 †Sestropoma
 †Sestropoma cribriferum
     †Seymouria – type locality for genus
 †Seymouria baylorensis – type locality for species
 †Shamovella
 †Shansiella
 †Shansiella beckwithana
 †Shansiella carbonaria
 †Shouchangoceras
 †Shouchangoceras americanum – type locality for species
 †Shumardella
 †Shumardella obsolescens
 †Shumardites
 †Shumardites cuyleri – type locality for species
 †Shumardites simondsi
 †Shwedagonia
 †Shwedagonia elegans – type locality for species
   †Sigillaria
 †Sigillaria brardii
 †Sigillariostrobus
 †Sigillariostrobus hastatus
 †Simplicarina
 †Simplicarina incompta
 †Sinuella – type locality for genus
 †Sinuella minuta – type locality for species
 †Sinuopea
 †Sinuopea humerosa
 †Sinuopea vera
 †Siphonosia
 †Siphonosia alleni
 †Skinnerella
 †Skinnerella biconica – type locality for species
 †Skinnerella brevis – type locality for species
 †Skinnerella cylindrica – type locality for species
 †Skinnerella diabloensis
 †Skinnerella formosa – type locality for species
 †Skinnerella magna – type locality for species
 †Skinnerella robusta – type locality for species
 †Skinnerella schucherti
 †Skinnerella speciosa – type locality for species
 †Skinnerella tenuis – type locality for species
 †Skinnerina
 †Skinnerina fusiformis – type locality for species
 †Skinnerina mildredae – type locality for species
 †Skinnerina rotundata – type locality for species
 †Slaugenhopia – type locality for genus
 †Slaugenhopia texensis – type locality for species
 †Soleachiton – type locality for genus
 †Soleachiton yochelsoni – type locality for species
  Solemya – tentative report
 †Soleniscus
 †Soleniscus diminutus – type locality for species
 †Soleniscus girtyi – type locality for species
 †Soleniscus primigenius
 †Soleniscus primogenius
 †Soleniscus regularis
 †Soleniscus texanus – type locality for species
 †Soleniscus typicus
 †Soleniscus variabilis
 †Solenochilus
 †Solenochilus kempae – type locality for species
 †Solenopora
 †Solenopora texana
 †Sollasia
 †Sollasia ostiolata
 †Sollasiella – type locality for genus
 †Sollasiella reticulata – type locality for species
 †Sowburia
 †Sowburia texana – type locality for species
 †Spermatodus
 †Spermatodus pustulosus
  †Sphenacanthus
 †Sphenophyllum
 †Sphenophyllum oblongifolium
 †Sphenophyllum obovatum
 †Sphenopteris
 †Sphenopteris macilenta – or unidentified comparable form
 †Spica
 †Spica texana – type locality for species
 †Spinarella
 †Spinarella costellata
 †Spinarella lobata
 †Spinarella paulula
 †Spinarella perfecta
 †Spinifrons
 †Spinifrons delicatula
 †Spinifrons magna
 †Spinifrons quadrata
 †Spinofenestella
 †Spinofenestella spinulosa – or unidentified related form
 †Spinomarginifera – or unidentified comparable form
  †Spirifer
 †Spirifer chappelensis – type locality for species
 †Spirifer gregeri – or unidentified comparable form
 †Spirifer guadalupensis – type locality for species
 †Spirifer rockymontanus
 †Spiriferella
 †Spiriferella calcarata
 †Spiriferella clypeata
 †Spiriferella embrithes
 †Spiriferella gloverae
 †Spiriferella gravis – type locality for species
 †Spiriferella levis – type locality for species
 †Spiriferella propria
 †Spiriferella sulcifer – type locality for species
 †Spiriferellina
 †Spiriferellina hilli – type locality for species
 †Spiriferellina nasuta
 †Spiriferellina nuda
 †Spiriferellina paucicostata – type locality for species
 †Spiriferellina tricosa – type locality for species
 †Spiriferellina vescula
 †Spiriferinaella
 †Spiriferinaella limata
 †Spiriferinaella medialis
 †Spiriferinaella scalpata – type locality for species
  Spirorbis
 †Spirorbis carbonarius – or unidentified comparable form
 †Spiroscala – type locality for genus
 †Spiroscala pagoda – type locality for species
 †Spiroscala pulchra – type locality for species
 †Spuriosa
 †Spuriosa circularis
 †Spyridiophora
 †Spyridiophora compacta
 †Spyridiophora distincta – type locality for species
 †Spyridiophora reticulata – type locality for species
 †Stacheoceras
 †Stacheoceras gilliamense – type locality for species
 †Staffella
 †Staffella lacunosa
 †Stearoceras
 †Stearoceras conchiferum
 †Stearoceras gibbosum – or unidentified related form
 †Stearoceras militarium – type locality for species
 †Stearoceras simplex – type locality for species
 †Stegochiton – type locality for genus
 †Stegochiton coxi – type locality for species
 †Stegochiton onerosus – type locality for species
 †Stegocoelia
 †Stegocoelia copei
 †Stegocoelia crenulata
 †Stegocoelia dozierensis – type locality for species
 †Stegocoelia missouriensis
 †Stellarocrinus
 †Stellarocrinus texani – type locality for species
 †Stenocoelia
 †Stenodiscus – tentative report
 †Stenoglaphyrites
 †Stenoglaphyrites incisus
 †Stenolobulites
 †Stenolobulites admiralensis – type locality for species
 †Stenolobulites depressus – type locality for species
 †Stenolobulites stenolobulus – type locality for species
 †Stenolobulites subglobosus – type locality for species
 †Stenolobulites type locality for species – informal
 †Stenopoceras
 †Stenopoceras inexpectans – type locality for species
 †Stenopoceras whitei – type locality for species
 †Stenopora
 †Stenopora granulosa – type locality for species
 †Stenopora richardsoni
 †Stenopronorites
 †Stenoscisma
 †Stenoscisma abbreviatum
 †Stenoscisma aberrans
 †Stenoscisma amoenum
 †Stenoscisma aptatum
 †Stenoscisma bellatulum
 †Stenoscisma bonum
 †Stenoscisma calvatum
 †Stenoscisma camurum
 †Stenoscisma doricranum
 †Stenoscisma exutum
 †Stenoscisma fabarium
 †Stenoscisma hadrum – type locality for species
 †Stenoscisma hueconianum – type locality for species
 †Stenoscisma inaequale – type locality for species
 †Stenoscisma indentata
 †Stenoscisma kalum
 †Stenoscisma levicostum
 †Stenoscisma maniculum
 †Stenoscisma multicostum
 †Stenoscisma myioides
 †Stenoscisma oblisum
 †Stenoscisma pansum
 †Stenoscisma peneleve
 †Stenoscisma problematicum
 †Stenoscisma pyraustoides – type locality for species
 †Stenoscisma renode – type locality for species
 †Stenoscisma repigratum
 †Stenoscisma schlotheimi – tentative report
 †Stenoscisma thevenini
 †Stenoscisma trabeatum
 †Stenoscisma triquetrum
 †Stenoscisma venustum
 †Stephanozyga
 †Stephanozyga subnodosa
   †Steppesaurus – type locality for genus
 †Steppesaurus gurleyi – type locality for species
 †Stereodictyum – type locality for genus
 †Stereodictyum orthoplectum – type locality for species
 †Stereophallodon – type locality for genus
 †Stereophallodon ciscoensis – type locality for species
 †Stereostylus
 †Stereostylus adelus – type locality for species
 †Stethacanthulus
 †Stethacanthulus decorus
 †Stethacanthulus meccaensis
 †Stethacanthus
 †Stethacanthus meccaensis
 †Stewartina
 †Stewartina convexa
 †Stewartina texana
 †Stioderma – type locality for genus
 †Stioderma coscinum – type locality for species
 †Straparollus
 †Straparollus savagei
 †Stratispongia – type locality for genus
 †Stratispongia cinctuta
 †Streblochondria
 †Streblochondria sculptilis
 †Streblopteria
 †Streblopteria montpelierensis
 †Streblotrypa
 †Strepsodiscus
 †Strepsodiscus paucivoluta
 †Streptacis
 †Streptacis inflata – type locality for species
 †Streptacis permiana – type locality for species
 †Streptacis piercei – type locality for species
 †Streptacis type locality for species – informal
 †Streptacis whitfieldi
 †Streptelasma
 †Streptelasma divaricans
 †Streptorhynchus – report made of unidentified related form or using admittedly obsolete nomenclature
 †Streptorhynchus shumardianus – tentative report
 †Striatites
 †Striatites richteri
 †Striatosaccites
 †Striatosaccites bullaeformis – type locality for species
 †Striatosaccites perisporites – type locality for species
 †Striatosaccites Type A – informal
 †Strigigenalis
 †Strigirhynchia
 †Strigirhynchia elongata
 †Strigirhynchia indentata – type locality for species
 †Strigirhynchia transversa
 †Strigogoniatites
 †Strigogoniatites fountaini – type locality for species
 †Strobeus
 †Strobeus brevis
 †Strobeus delawarensis – type locality for species
 †Strobeus paludinaeformis
 †Strobeus poromus
 †Stromatidium – type locality for genus
 †Stromatidium typicale – type locality for species
 †Strophalosia
 †Strophella
 †Strophella grandaevus
   †Strophomena
 †Strophomena neglecta
 †Stuartwellercrinus
 †Stuartwellercrinus symmetricus – type locality for species
 †Stuartwellercrinus texanus – type locality for species
 †Stuartwellercrinus turbinatus – type locality for species
 †Stutchburia
 †Subkargalites
 †Subkargalites hargisi – type locality for species
 †Subkargalites parkeri
 †Subperrinites
 †Subperrinites bakeri – type locality for species
 †Subperrinites denhami – type locality for species
 †Subperrinites mooreae – type locality for species
 †Sulcataria
 †Sulcataria compacta
 †Sulcataria latisulcata
 †Svetlanoceras
 †Svetlanoceras moylei – type locality for species
 †Symphysurina
 †Syngastrioceras
 †Syngastrioceras globulosum
 †Syngastrioceras scotti
 †Synocladia
 †Syntrophina
 †Syntrophinella
 †Syringoclemis – tentative report
  †Syringopora – tentative report

T

 †Tabulipora
 †Tabulipora carbonaria
 †Taenicephalus
 †Taeniopteris
 †Taeniopteris abnormis
 †Taeniopteris coriacea – tentative report
 †Taeniopteris eckardtii
 †Taeniopteris multinervis
 †Taeniopters
 †Tainoceras
 †Tainoceras clydense – type locality for species
 †Taphrosestria
 †Taphrosestria expansa
 †Taphrosestria peculiaris
 †Tapinotomaria
 †Tapinotomaria coronata – type locality for species
 †Tapinotomaria costata – type locality for species
 †Tapinotomaria crassa – type locality for species
 †Tapinotomaria duplicostata – type locality for species
 †Tapinotomaria globosa – type locality for species
 †Tapinotomaria mirabilis – type locality for species
 †Tapinotomaria pyramidalis – type locality for species
 †Tapinotomaria rugosa – type locality for species
 †Tapinotomaria submirabilis – type locality for species
 †Tappenosaurus – type locality for genus
 †Tappenosaurus magnus – type locality for species
 †Tarphyceras
 †Tarphyceras chadwickense
 †Tarthinia
 †Tautosia
 †Tautosia angulata
 †Tautosia distorta
 †Tautosia elegans
 †Tautosia expansa
 †Tautosia fastigiata
 †Tautosia galbina
 †Tautosia lenumbona
 †Tautosia magnisepta
 †Tautosia podistra – type locality for species
 †Tautosia pulchra
 †Tautosia shumardiana
 †Tautosia transenna – type locality for species
 †Teguliferina
 †Teguliferina armata
 †Teguliferina boesei – type locality for species
 †Teguliferina compacta – type locality for species
 †Teguliferina solidispinosa
 †Teiichispira
 †Teiichispira nanus – type locality for species
 †Temnocheilus
 †Terebratula – report made of unidentified related form or using admittedly obsolete nomenclature
 †Terebratula perinflata – type locality for species
 †Terebratuloidea
 †Terebratuloidea triplicata
 †Tersomius – type locality for genus
 †Tersomius texensis – type locality for species
  †Tesnusocaris – type locality for genus
 †Tesnusocaris goldichi – type locality for species
    †Tetraceratops – type locality for genus
 †Tetraceratops insignis – type locality for species
 †Tetralobula
 †Tetrataxis
 †Tetravirga
 †Texarina
 †Texarina elongata – type locality for species
 †Texarina oblongata
 †Texarina parallela
 †Texarina paucula
 †Texarina solida
 †Texarina wordensis – type locality for species
 †Texasodus – type locality for genus
 †Texasodus varidentatus – type locality for species
 †Texoceras
 †Texoceras texanum – type locality for species
 †Thaerodonta
 †Thaerodonta recedens – or unidentified comparable form
 †Thalattocanthus
 †Thalattocanthus consonus
 †Thamniscus
 †Thamniscus digitatus – type locality for species
 †Thamnosia
 †Thamnosia anterospinosa
 †Thamnosia arctica
 †Thamnosia capitanensis
 †Thamnosia parvispinosa
 †Thamnosia phragmophora
 †Thamnosia silicica
 †Thedusia – type locality for genus
 †Thedusia angustata
 †Thedusia biconvexa
 †Thedusia bucrenata
 †Thedusia dischides
 †Thedusia discissa
 †Thedusia emarginata
 †Thedusia magna
 †Thedusia mesocostata
 †Thedusia paucicostata
 †Thedusia procera – type locality for species
 †Thedusia trigonalis
 †Thedusia ventricosa
 †Thigriffides
 †Thigriffides roundyi
 †Thuroholia
 †Thuroholia cribriformis
 †Timaniella
 †Timaniella pseudocamerata
 †Timanodictya – tentative report
 †Timorina
 †Timorina attenuata
 †Timorina ovata
 †Timorina schuchertensis – type locality for species
 †Timorites
 †Timorites schucherti – or unidentified comparable form
 †Timorites uddeni – type locality for species
 †Tingia
 †Tinsleya – type locality for genus
 †Tinsleya texana – type locality for species
 †Tomicosaurus – report made of unidentified related form or using admittedly obsolete nomenclature
 †Toomeyospongia – type locality for genus
 †Toomeyospongia apachensis – type locality for species
 †Toomeyospongia gigantia – type locality for species
 †Toomeyospongia modica – type locality for species
 †Toomeyospongiella – type locality for genus
 †Toomeyospongiella minuta – type locality for species
 †Tornquistia – tentative report
 †Tornquistia transversalis – type locality for species
 †Torynechus
 †Torynechus alectorius
 †Torynechus caelatus – type locality for species
 †Tostonia
 †Trabeculites – type locality for genus
 †Trabeculites keithae – type locality for species
 †Trachydomia
 †Trachydomia turbonitella – type locality for species
 †Trailospongia – type locality for genus
 †Trailospongia reischi – type locality for species
 †Transennatia
 †Transennatia gratiosa
 †Trepospira
 †Trepospira depressa
 †Trepospira discoidalis
 †Trepospira illinoisensis
 †Trepospira sphaerulata
 †Trepsipleura – type locality for genus
 †Trepsipleura chordanodosa – type locality for species
 †Trepsipleura nodosa – type locality for species
 †Trichasaurus – type locality for genus
 †Trichasaurus texensis – type locality for species
 †Tricoria
 †Tricoria hirpex
 †Tricrepicephalus
 †Tricrepicephalus coria
 †Tricrepicephalus texanus
 †Trigonoglossa
 †Trigonoglossa nebrascensis
 †Trigonoproductus
 †Trigonoproductus inexpectans
     †Trimerorhachis
 †Trimerorhachis greggi – type locality for species
 †Trimerorhachis insignis – type locality for species
 †Trimerorhachis mesops – type locality for species
 †Trimerorhachis rogersi – type locality for species
 †Triproetus
 †Triproetus altasulcus – type locality for species
 †Triproetus angustus – type locality for species
 †Triproetus tumidus – type locality for species
 †Tristratocoelia
 †Tristratocoelia rhythmica
 †Triticites
 †Triticites cellamagnus – or unidentified comparable form
 †Trochilioceras – type locality for genus
 †Trochilioceras tenuosum – type locality for species
  Trochus – report made of unidentified related form or using admittedly obsolete nomenclature
 †Trophisina
 †Trophisina fenaria
 †Tropidelasma
 †Tropidelasma anthicum – type locality for species
 †Tropidelasma corniculum
 †Tropidelasma costellatum – type locality for species
 †Tropidelasma culmenatum
 †Tropidelasma furcillatum
 †Tropidelasma gregarium – type locality for species
 †Tropidelasma perattenuatum – type locality for species
 †Tropidelasma pygmaeum – type locality for species
 †Tropidelasma rhamphodes – type locality for species
 †Tropidelasma robertsi
 †Tropidelasma strobilum – type locality for species
 †Tropidelasma undulatum – type locality for species
 Trypetesa
 †Trypetesa caveata
 †Tschernyschewia
 †Tschernyschewia americana
 †Tuberitina
 †Tumulites
 †Tumulites varians – or unidentified comparable form
 †Tunstallia – report made of unidentified related form or using admittedly obsolete nomenclature
 †Tunstallia helicina – tentative report
 Turbo – report made of unidentified related form or using admittedly obsolete nomenclature
 †Turbo guadalupensis – type locality for species
 †Turbo texanus – type locality for species
 †Turgidiffia – type locality for genus
 †Turgidiffia columellata – type locality for species
 †Turgidiffia completa – type locality for species
 †Turgidiffia composita – type locality for species
 †Tylothyris
 †Tylothyris brevaurita – type locality for species
 †Tylothyris missouriensis – or unidentified comparable form

U

 †Uddenites – type locality for genus
 †Uddenites harlani – type locality for species
 †Uddenites oweni – type locality for species
 †Uddenites schucherti – type locality for species
 †Uddenites serratus – type locality for species
 †Uddenoceras
 †Uddenoceras oweni
 †Ullmannia
 †Ulocrinus
 †Ulrichotrypa – tentative report
 †Uncinuloides
 †Uncinuloides guadalupensis
 †Undellaria
 †Undellaria magnifica
 †Undulella
 †Undulella guadalupensis
 †Undulella matutina
 †Undulella undulata – type locality for species

V

  †Varanops
 †Varanops brevirostris – type locality for species
 †Varanosaurus – type locality for genus
 †Varanosaurus acutirostris – type locality for species
 †Varanosaurus wichitaensis – type locality for species
 †Varialepis – report made of unidentified related form or using admittedly obsolete nomenclature
 †Vesicaspora
 †Vesicaspora schaubergeri
  †Vidria
 †Vidria vespa
 †Vidrioceras
 †Vidrioceras irregulare – type locality for species
 †Vidrioceras uddeni – type locality for species
 †Virgola
 †Virgola neptunia
 †Virgola rigida
 †Voiseyella
 †Voiseyella texana – type locality for species
 †Vorticina
 †Vorticina keytei – type locality for species

W

 †Waagenella
 †Waagenella crassus
 †Waagenella lineatus – type locality for species
 †Waagenella plummeri – type locality for species
 †Waagenina
 †Waagenina rothi – type locality for species
 †Waagenoceras
 †Waagenoceras dieneri
 †Waagenoconcha
 †Waagenoconcha convexa
 †Waagenoconcha leonardensis – type locality for species
 †Waagenoconcha magnifica – type locality for species
 †Waagenoconcha platys
 †Waagenoconcha prophetica
 †Waagenoconcha sulcata
 †Waggoneria – type locality for genus
 †Waggoneria knoxensis – type locality for species
   †Walchia
 †Walchia piniformis
 †Walchia schlotheimii
 †Walchia schneideri
 †Walchiostrobus
 †Walliserodus
 †Warthia
 †Warthia americana – type locality for species
 †Warthia angustior – type locality for species
 †Warthia crassus – type locality for species
 †Warthia fissus – type locality for species
 †Warthia saundersi – type locality for species
 †Warthia waageni – type locality for species
 †Warthia welleri
 †Wattia – type locality for genus
 †Wattia texana – type locality for species
 †Wellerella
 †Wellerella bidentata
 †Wellerella girtyi – type locality for species
 †Wellerella nitidula
 †Wellerella osagensis
 †Wellerites – type locality for genus
 †Wellerites mohri – type locality for species
 †Whitspakia
 †Whitspakia schucherti
 †Wiedeyoceras
 †Wiedeyoceras pingue
 †Wilbernicyathus
 †Wilbernicyathus donegani
 †Wilkingia
 †Wilkingia dubium – or unidentified comparable form
 †Wilkingia rothi
 †Wilkingia terminale
 †Woosteroceras
 †Woosteroceras cherokeense
 †Woosteroceras flexiseptatum – type locality for species
 †Woosteroceras percurvatum – type locality for species
 †Woosteroceras spirale – type locality for species
 †Worthenia
 †Worthenia alticarinata – type locality for species
 †Worthenia arizonensis
 †Worthenia bialveozona
 †Worthenia bicarinata – type locality for species
 †Worthenia corrugata
 †Worthenia crenulata
 †Worthenia kingi – type locality for species
 †Worthenia latialveozona
 †Worthenia pilula – type locality for species
 †Worthenia planalveozona
 †Worthenia speciosa
 †Worthenia tabulata
 †Worthenia whitehorsensis – type locality for species
 †Wortheniopsis
 †Wurmiella
 †Wurmiella excavata

X

  †Xenacanthus
 †Xenacanthus platypternus
 †Xenacanthus texensis
 †Xenechinus – type locality for genus
 †Xenechinus parvus – type locality for species
 †Xenelasma
 †Xenelasma synthrophioides
 †Xenosaria
 †Xenosaria exotica
 †Xenosteges – type locality for genus
 †Xenosteges adherens – type locality for species
 †Xenosteges anomalus
 †Xenosteges magnus
 †Xenosteges quadratus – type locality for species
 †Xenosteges trivialis
 †Xenosteges umbonatus
 †Xestosia – type locality for genus
 †Xestosia obsolescens
 †Xestosia schucherti – type locality for species
 †Xinjiangospira
 †Xinjiangospira type locality for species – informal
  †Xyloiulus – tentative report

Y

 †Yakovlevia
 †Yakovlevia anterospinosa
 †Yakovlevia costellata
 †Yakovlevia hessorum
 †Yakovlevia immatura
 †Yakovlevia indentata
 †Yakovlevia intermedia
 †Yakovlevia multistriata
 †Yakovlevia sulcata
 †Yochelsonellisa
 †Yochelsonellisa eximia
 Yoldia – tentative report
 †Yoldia subscitula
 †Yunnania

Z

 †Zaphrenthis
 †Zaphrenthis gibsoni
  †Zatrachys
 †Zatrachys conchigerus – type locality for species
 †Zatrachys serratus
 †Zeilleropteris
 †Zeilleropteris wattii – type locality for species
 †Zhonglupuceras
 †Zhonglupuceras mapesi
 †Zygopleura
 †Zygopleura swalloviana – type locality for species
 †Zygospira
 †Zygospira resupinata

References

 

Paleozoic
Texas
Texas-related lists